Portugal, officially the Portuguese Republic, is a country located on the Iberian Peninsula, in southwestern Europe, and whose territory also includes the Atlantic archipelagos of the Azores and Madeira. It features the westernmost point in continental Europe, and its Iberian portion is bordered to the west and south by the Atlantic Ocean and to the north and east by Spain, the sole country to have a land border with Portugal. Its two archipelagos form two autonomous regions with their own regional governments. Lisbon is the capital and largest city by population.

One of the oldest countries in Europe, its territory has been continuously settled, invaded and fought over since prehistoric times. The territory was first inhabited by pre-Roman and Celtic peoples (at the time of the first large-scale Roman invasions in Western Iberia, they preponderantly were the Lusitanians, the Gallaecians, the Celtici and, to some extent, the Conii). These peoples had commercial and some cultural contact with Phoenicians, ancient Greeks and Carthaginians. It was later ruled by the Romans, followed by the invasions of Germanic peoples (most prominently, the Suebi and the Visigoths) together with the Alans, and later the Moors, who were eventually expelled during the Reconquista. Founded first as a county within the Kingdom of León in 868, the country officially gained its independence as the Kingdom of Portugal with the Treaty of Zamora in 1143. 

In the 15th and 16th centuries, Portugal established one of the longest-lived maritime and commercial empires, becoming one of the main economic and political powers of the time. At the end of the 16th century, however, Portugal suffered a war for the crown succession which led to the incorporation of the country into the Spanish monarchy during the Iberian Union.

By the early 19th century, the accumulative crisis, events such as the 1755 Lisbon earthquake, the country's occupation during the Napoleonic Wars, and the resulting independence of Brazil in 1822 led to a marked decay of Portugal's prior opulence. This was followed by the civil war between liberal constitutionalists and conservative absolutists over royal succession, which lasted from 1828 to 1834. The 1910 revolution deposed Portugal's centuries-old monarchy, and established the democratic but unstable Portuguese First Republic, later being superseded by the Estado Novo (New State) authoritarian regime. Democracy was restored after the Carnation Revolution (1974), ending the Portuguese Colonial War and eventually losing its remaining colonial possessions.

Portugal has left a profound cultural, architectural and linguistic influence across the globe, with a legacy of around 250 million Portuguese speakers around the world. It is a developed country with an advanced economy which holds the 14th largest gold reserve at its national central bank representing the highest percentage share held in gold of total foreign reserves by any nation, the 8th largest proven reserves of lithium, with the weight of exports representing 49% of its GDP in 2022 and high living standards. Additionally, it ranks highly in peacefulness, democracy, press freedom, stability, social progress, prosperity and English proficiency. A member of the United Nations, the European Union, the Schengen Area and the Council of Europe (CoE), Portugal was also one of the founding members of NATO, the eurozone, the OECD, and the Community of Portuguese Language Countries.

Etymology 

The word Portugal derives from the combined Roman-Celtic place name Portus Cale; a settlement where present-day’s conurbation of Porto and Vila Nova de Gaia (or simply, Gaia) stand, along the banks of River Douro in the north of what is now Portugal. The name of Porto stems from the Latin word for port or harbour, with the second element Cale’s meaning and precise origin being less clear. The mainstream explanation points to an ethnonym derived from the Callaeci also known as Gallaeci peoples, who occupied the north-west of the Iberian Peninsula. The names Cale and Callaici are the origin of today's Gaia and Galicia.

Another theory proposes that Cale or Calle is a derivation of the Celtic word for 'port', like the Irish  or Scottish Gaelic . These explanations, would require the pre-Roman language of the area to have been a branch of Q-Celtic, which is not generally accepted because the region's pre-Roman language was Gallaecian. However, scholars like Jean Markale and Tranoy propose that the Celtic branches all share the same origin, and placenames such as Cale, Gal, Gaia, Calais, Galatia, Galicia, Gaelic, Gael, Gaul, Wales, Cornwall, Wallonia and others all stem from one linguistic root.

A further explanation proposes Gatelo as having been the origin of present-day Braga, Santiago de Compostela, and consequently the wider regions of Northern Portugal and Galicia.
A different theory has it that Cala was the name of a Celtic goddess (drawing a comparison with the Gaelic Cailleach, a supernatural hag).

Around 200 BC, the Romans took the Iberian Peninsula from the Carthaginians during the Second Punic War. In the process they conquered Cale, renaming it  ('Port of Cale') and incorporating it in the province of Gaellicia with its capital in Bracara Augusta (modern day Braga, Portugal). During the Middle Ages, the region around Portus Cale became known by the Suebi and Visigoths as Portucale. The name Portucale evolved into Portugale during the 7th and 8th centuries, and by the 9th century, that term was used extensively to refer to the region between the rivers Douro and Minho. By the 11th and 12th centuries, Portugale, Portugallia, Portvgallo or Portvgalliae was already referred to as Portugal.

The 14th-century Middle French name for the country, which added an intrusive /n/ sound through the process of excrescence, spread to Middle English. The spelling  is found in Chaucer's Epilogue to the Nun's Priest's Tale. These variants survive in the Torrent of Portyngale, a Middle English romance composed around 1400, and "Old Robin of Portingale", an English Child ballad.  and variants were also used in Scots and survive in the Cornish name for the country, Portyngal.

History

Prehistory 

The early history of Portugal is shared with the rest of the Iberian Peninsula located in south-western Europe. The name of Portugal derives from the joined Romano-Celtic name Portus Cale. The region was settled by Pre-Celts and Celts, giving origin to peoples like the Gallaeci, Lusitanians, Celtici and Cynetes (also known as Conii), visited by Phoenicians-Carthaginians and Ancient Greeks, was incorporated in the Roman Republic dominions as Lusitania and part of Gallaecia, after 45 BC until 298 AD.

The region of present-day Portugal was inhabited by Neanderthals and then by Homo sapiens, who roamed the border-less region of the northern Iberian peninsula. These were subsistence societies and although they did not establish prosperous settlements, they did form organized societies. Neolithic Portugal experimented with domestication of herding animals, the raising of some cereal crops and fluvial or marine fishing.

It is believed by some scholars that early in the first millennium BC, several waves of Celts invaded Portugal from Central Europe and inter-married with the local populations, forming different tribes. Another theory suggests that Celts inhabited western Iberia / Portugal well before any large Celtic migrations from Central Europe. In addition, a number of linguists expert in ancient Celtic have presented compelling evidence that the Tartessian language, once spoken in parts of SW Spain and SW Portugal, is at least proto-Celtic in structure.

Modern archaeology and research shows a Portuguese root to the Celts in Portugal and elsewhere. During that period and until the Roman invasions, the Castro culture (a variation of the Urnfield culture also known as Urnenfelderkultur) was prolific in Portugal and modern Galicia.
This culture, together with the surviving elements of the Atlantic megalithic culture and the contributions that come from the more Western Mediterranean cultures, ended up in what has been called the Cultura Castreja or Castro Culture. This designation refers to the characteristic Celtic populations called 'dùn', 'dùin' or 'don' in Gaelic and that the Romans called castrae in their chronicles.

Based on the Roman chronicles about the Callaeci peoples, along with the Lebor Gabála Érenn narrations and the interpretation of the abundant archaeological remains throughout the northern half of Portugal and Galicia, it is possible to infer that there was a matriarchal society, with a military and religious aristocracy probably of the feudal type.
 The figures of maximum authority were the chieftain (chefe tribal), of military type and with authority in his Castro or clan, and the druid, mainly referring to medical and religious functions that could be common to several castros. The Celtic cosmogony remained homogeneous due to the ability of the druids to meet in councils with the druids of other areas, which ensured the transmission of knowledge and the most significant events.

The first documentary references to Castro society are provided by chroniclers of Roman military campaigns such as Strabo, Herodotus and Pliny the Elder among others, about the social organization, and describing the inhabitants of these territories, the Gallaeci of Northern Portugal as:

"A group of barbarians who spend the day fighting and the night eating, drinking and dancing under the moon."

There were other similar tribes, and chief among them were the Lusitanians; the core area of these people lay in inland central Portugal, while numerous other related tribes existed such as the Celtici of Alentejo, and the Cynetes or Conii of the Algarve. Among the tribes or sub-divisions were the Bracari, Coelerni, Equaesi, Grovii, Interamici, Leuni, Luanqui, Limici, Narbasi, Nemetati, Paesuri, Quaquerni, Seurbi, Tamagani, Tapoli, Turduli, Turduli Veteres, Turdulorum Oppida, Turodi, and Zoelae. A few small, semi-permanent, commercial coastal settlements (such as Tavira) were also founded in the Algarve region by Phoenicians–Carthaginians.

Roman Lusitania and Gallaecia 

Romans first invaded the Iberian Peninsula in 219 BC. The Carthaginians, Rome's adversary in the Punic Wars, were expelled from their coastal colonies. During the last days of Julius Caesar, almost the entire peninsula was annexed to the Roman Republic.

The Roman conquest of what is now part of Portugal took almost two hundred years and took many lives of young soldiers and
the lives of those who were sentenced to a certain death in the slave mines when not sold as slaves to other parts of the empire. It suffered a severe setback in 155 BC, when a rebellion began in the north. The Lusitanians and other native tribes, under the leadership of Viriathus, wrested control of all of western Iberia.

Rome sent numerous legions and its best generals to Lusitania to quell the rebellion, but to no avail – the Lusitanians kept conquering territory. The Roman leaders decided to change their strategy. They bribed Viriathus's allies to kill him. In 139 BC, Viriathus was assassinated and Tautalus became leader of the Lusitanians.

Rome installed a colonial regime. The complete Romanization of Lusitania only took place in the Visigothic era.

In 27 BC, Lusitania gained the status of Roman province. Later, a northern province of Lusitania was formed, known as Gallaecia, with capital in Bracara Augusta, today's Braga.
There are still many ruins of castros (hill forts) throughout modern Portugal and remains of the Castro culture.
Some urban remains are quite large, like Conímbriga and Mirobriga. The former, beyond being one of the largest Roman settlements in Portugal, is also classified as a National Monument. The site also has a museum that displays objects found by archaeologists during their excavations.

Several works of engineering, such as baths, temples, bridges, roads, circuses, theatres and laymen's homes are preserved throughout the country. Coins, some coined in Lusitanian land, as well as numerous pieces of ceramics, were also found. Contemporary historians include Paulus Orosius (c. 375–418) and Hydatius (c. 400–469), bishop of Aquae Flaviae, who reported on the final years of the Roman rule and arrival of the Germanic tribes.

Germanic kingdoms: Suebi and Visigoths 

In the early 5th century, Germanic tribes, namely the Suebi and the Vandals (Silingi and Hasdingi) together with their allies, the Sarmatians and Alans invaded the Iberian Peninsula where they would form their kingdom. The Kingdom of the Suebi was the Germanic post-Roman kingdom, established in the former Roman provinces of Gallaecia-Lusitania. 5th-century vestiges of Alan settlements were found in Alenquer (from old Germanic Alan kerk, temple of the Alans), Coimbra and Lisbon.

About 410 and during the 6th century it became a formally declared Kingdom of the Suebi, where king Hermeric made a peace treaty with the Gallaecians before passing his domains to Rechila, his son. In 448 Rechila died, leaving the state in expansion to Rechiar.
After the defeat against the Visigoths, the Suebian kingdom was divided, with Frantan and Aguiulfo ruling simultaneously. Both reigned from 456 to 457, the year in which Maldras (457–459) reunified the kingdom. He was assassinated after a failed Roman-Visigothic conspiracy.
Although the conspiracy did not achieve its true purposes, the Suebian Kingdom was again divided between two kings:
Frumar (Frumario 459–463) and Remismund (Remismundo, son of Maldras) (459–469) who would re-reunify his father's kingdom in 463. He would be forced to adopt Arianism in 465 due to the Visigoth influence.
By 500, the Visigothic Kingdom had been installed in Iberia, it was based in Toledo and advancing westwards. They became a threat to the Suebian rule.
After the death of Remismund in 469 a dark period set in, where virtually all written texts and accounts disappear. This period lasted until 550. The only thing known about this period is that Theodemund (Teodemundo) most probably ruled the Suebians.
The dark period ended with the reign of Karriarico (550–559) who reinstalled Catholic Christianity in 550. He was succeeded by Theodemar (559–570) during whose reign the 1st Council of Braga (561) was held.

The councils represented an advance in the organization of the territory (paroeciam suevorum (Suebian parish) and the Christianization of the pagan population (De correctione rusticorum) under the auspices of Saint Martin of Braga (São Martinho de Braga).

After the death of Teodomiro, Miro (570–583) was his successor. During his reign, the 2nd Council of Braga (572) was held.
The Visigothic civil war began in 577. Miro intervened. Later in 583 he also organized an unsuccessful expedition to reconquer Seville. During the return from this failed operation Miro died.

In the Suebian Kingdom many internal struggles continued to take place. Eborico (Eurico, 583–584) was dethroned by Andeca (Audeca 584–585), who failed to prevent the Visigothic invasion led by Leovigildo. The Visigothic invasion, completed in 585, turned the once rich and fertile kingdom of the Suebi into the sixth province of the Gothic kingdom.
Leovigild was crowned King of Gallaecia, Hispania and Gallia Narbonensis.

For the next 300 years and by the year 700, the entire Iberian Peninsula was ruled by the Visigoths. Under the Visigoths, Gallaecia was a well-defined space governed by a doge of its own. Doges at this time were related to the monarchy and acted as princes in all matters. Both 'governors' Wamba and Wittiza (Vitiza) acted as doge (they would later become kings in Toledo). These two became known as the 'vitizians', who headquartered in the northwest and called on the Arab invaders from the South to be their allies in the struggle for power in 711. King Roderic (Rodrigo) was killed while opposing this invasion, thus becoming the last Visigothic king of Iberia. From the various Germanic groups who settled in western Iberia, the Suebi left the strongest lasting cultural legacy in what is today Portugal, Galicia and western fringes of Asturias.
According to Dan Stanislawski, the Portuguese way of living in regions North of the Tagus is mostly inherited from the Suebi, in which small farms prevail, distinct from the large properties of Southern Portugal.
Bracara Augusta, the modern city of Braga and former capital of Gallaecia, became the capital of the Suebi. Apart from cultural and some linguistic traces, the Suebians left the highest Germanic genetic contribution of the Iberian Peninsula in Portugal and Galicia. Orosius, at that time resident in Hispania, shows a rather pacific initial settlement, the newcomers working their lands or serving as bodyguards of the locals.
Another Germanic group that accompanied the Suebi and settled in Gallaecia were the Buri. They settled in the region between the rivers Cávado and Homem, in the area known as Terras de Bouro (Lands of the Buri).

Islamic period and the Reconquista 

Today's continental Portugal, along with most of modern Spain, was part of al-Andalus between 726 and 1249, following the Umayyad Caliphate conquest of the Iberian Peninsula. This rule lasted from some decades in the North to five centuries in the South.

After defeating the Visigoths in only a few months, the Umayyad Caliphate started expanding rapidly in the peninsula. Beginning in 726, the land that is now Portugal became part of the vast Umayyad Caliphate's empire of Damascus, which stretched from the Indus river in the Indian sub-continent up to the South of France, until its collapse in 750. That year the west of the empire gained its independence under Abd-ar-Rahman I with the establishment of the Emirate of Córdoba. After almost two centuries, the Emirate became the Caliphate of Córdoba in 929, until its dissolution a century later in 1031 into no less than 23 small kingdoms, called Taifa kingdoms.

The governors of the taifas each proclaimed themselves Emir of their provinces and established diplomatic relations with the Christian kingdoms of the north. Most of present-day Portugal fell into the hands of the Taifa of Badajoz of the Aftasid Dynasty, and after a short spell of an ephemeral Taifa of Lisbon in 1022, fell under the dominion of the Taifa of Seville of the Abbadids poets. The Taifa period ended with the conquest of the Almoravids who came from Morocco in 1086 winning a decisive victory at the Battle of Sagrajas, followed a century later in 1147, after the second period of Taifa, by the Almohads, also from Marrakesh.
Al-Andaluz was divided into different districts called Kura. Gharb Al-Andalus at its largest consisted of ten kuras, each with a distinct capital and governor. The main cities of the period in Portugal were in the southern half of the country: Beja, Silves, Alcácer do Sal, Santarém and Lisbon.
The Muslim population of the region consisted mainly of native Iberian converts to Islam (the so-called Muwallad or Muladi) and Arabs. The Arabs were principally noblemen from Syria and Oman; and though few in numbers, they constituted the elite of the population. The Berbers were originally from the Rif and Atlas mountains region of North Africa and were nomads.

County of Portugal 

An Asturian Visigothic noble named Pelagius of Asturias in 718 was elected leader by many of the ousted Visigoth nobles. Pelagius called for the remnant of the Christian Visigothic armies to rebel against the Moors and regroup in the unconquered northern Asturian highlands, better known today as the Cantabrian Mountains, in what is today the small mountain region in north-western Spain, adjacent to the Bay of Biscay.

Pelagius' plan was to use the Cantabrian mountains as a place of refuge and protection from the invading Moors. He then aimed to regroup the Iberian Peninsula's Christian armies and use the Cantabrian mountains as a springboard from which to regain their lands. In the process, after defeating the Moors in the Battle of Covadonga in 722, Pelagius was proclaimed king, thus founding the Christian Kingdom of Asturias and starting the war of Christian reconquest known in Portuguese as the Reconquista Cristã.

At the end of the 9th century, the region of Portugal, between the rivers Minho and Douro, was reconquered from the Moors by the nobleman and knight Vímara Peres on the orders of King Alfonso III of Asturias. Finding that the region had previously had two major cities – Portus Cale in the coast and Braga in the interior, with many towns that were now deserted – he decided to repopulate and rebuild them with Portuguese and Galician refugees and other Christians.
Apart from the Arabs from the South, the coastal regions in the North were also attacked by Norman and Viking raiders mainly from 844. The last great invasion, through the Minho (river), ended with the defeat of Olaf II Haraldsson in 1014 against the Galician nobility who also stopped further advances into the County of Portugal.

Count Vímara Peres organized the region he had reconquered, and elevated it to the status of County, naming it the County of Portugal after the region's major port city – Portus Cale or modern Porto. One of the first cities Vimara Peres founded at this time is Vimaranes, known today as Guimarães – the "birthplace of the Portuguese nation" or the "cradle city" (Cidade Berço in Portuguese).

After annexing the County of Portugal into one of the several counties that made up the Kingdom of Asturias, King Alfonso III of Asturias knighted Vímara Peres, in 868, as the First Count of Portus Cale (Portugal). The region became known as Portucale, Portugale, and simultaneously Portugália – the County of Portugal.

Later the Kingdom of Asturias was divided into a number of Christian Kingdoms in Northern Iberia due to dynastic divisions of inheritance among the king's offspring. With the forced abdication of Alfonso III "the Great" of Asturias by his sons in 910, the Kingdom of Asturias split into three separate kingdoms. The three kingdoms were eventually reunited in 924 under the crown of León.

In 1093, Alfonso VI of León bestowed the county to Henry of Burgundy and married him to his illegitimate daughter, Teresa of León, for his role in reconquering the land from Moors. Henry based his newly formed county in Bracara Augusta (modern Braga), capital city of the ancient Roman province, and also previous capital of several kingdoms over the first millennia.

Independence and Afonsine era

On 24 June 1128, the Battle of São Mamede occurred near Guimarães. Afonso Henriques, Count of Portugal, defeated his mother Countess Teresa and her lover Fernão Peres de Trava, thereby establishing himself as sole leader. Afonso then turned his arms against the Moors in the south.

Afonso's campaigns were successful and, on 25 July 1139, he obtained an overwhelming victory in the Battle of Ourique, and straight after was unanimously proclaimed King of Portugal by his soldiers. This is traditionally taken as the occasion when the County of Portugal, as a fief of the Kingdom of León, was transformed into the independent Kingdom of Portugal.

Afonso then established the first of the Portuguese Cortes at Lamego, where he was crowned by the Archbishop of Braga, though the validity of the Cortes of Lamego has been disputed and called a myth created during the Portuguese Restoration War. Afonso was recognized in 1143 by King Alfonso VII of León, and in 1179 by Pope Alexander III.

During the Reconquista period, Christians reconquered the Iberian Peninsula from Moorish domination. Afonso Henriques and his successors, aided by military monastic orders, pushed southward to drive out the Moors. At this time, Portugal covered about half of its present area. In 1249, the Reconquista ended with the capture of the Algarve and complete expulsion of the last Moorish settlements on the southern coast, giving Portugal its present-day borders, with minor exceptions.

In one of these situations of conflict with the kingdom of Castile, Dinis I of Portugal signed with the king Fernando IV of Castile (who was represented, when a minor, by his mother the queen Maria de Molina) the Treaty of Alcañices (1297), which stipulated that Portugal abolished agreed treaties against the kingdom of Castile for supporting the infant Juan de Castilla. This treaty established among other things the border demarcation between the kingdom of Portugal and the kingdom of Leon, where the disputed town of Olivenza was included.

The reigns of Dinis I (Denis I), Afonso IV (Alphons IV), and Pedro I (Peter I) for the most part saw peace with the Christian kingdoms of Iberia.

In 1348 and 1349 Portugal, like the rest of Europe, was devastated by the Black Death. In 1373, Portugal made an alliance with England, which is one of the oldest standing alliances in the world. Over time, this went far beyond geo-political and military cooperation (protecting both nations' interests in Africa, the Americas and Asia against French, Spanish and Dutch rivals) and maintained strong trade and cultural ties between the two old European allies. In the Oporto region, in particular, there is visible English influence to this day.

Joanine era and Age of Discoveries 
 

In 1383, John I of Castile, husband of Beatrice of Portugal and son-in-law of Ferdinand I of Portugal, claimed the throne of Portugal. A faction of petty noblemen and commoners, led by John of Aviz (later King John I of Portugal) and commanded by General Nuno Álvares Pereira defeated the Castilians in the Battle of Aljubarrota. With this battle, the House of Aviz became the ruling house of Portugal.

The new ruling dynasty would proceed to push Portugal to the limelight of European politics and culture, creating and sponsoring works of literature, like the Crónicas d'el Rei D. João I by Fernão Lopes, the first riding and hunting manual Livro da ensinança de bem cavalgar toda sela and O Leal Conselheiro both by King Edward of Portugal and the Portuguese translations of Cicero's De Oficiis and Seneca's De Beneficiis by the well traveled Prince Peter of Coimbra, as well as his magnum opus Tratado da Vertuosa Benfeytoria. In an effort of solidification and centralization of royal power the monarchs of this dynasty also ordered the compilation, organization and publication of the first three compilations of laws in Portugal: the Ordenações d'el Rei D. Duarte, which was never enforced; the Ordenações Afonsinas, whose application and enforcement was not uniform across the realm; and the Ordenações Manuelinas, which took advantage of the printing press to reach every corner of the kingdom. The Avis Dynasty also sponsored works of architecture like the Mosteiro da Batalha (literally, the Monastery of the Battle) and led to the creation of the manueline style of architecture in the 16th century.

Portugal also spearheaded European exploration of the world and the Age of Discovery. Prince Henry the Navigator, son of King John I of Portugal, became the main sponsor and patron of this endeavour. During this period, Portugal explored the Atlantic Ocean, discovering the Atlantic archipelagos the Azores, Madeira, and Cape Verde; explored the African coast; colonized selected areas of Africa; discovered an eastern route to India via the Cape of Good Hope; discovered Brazil, explored the Indian Ocean, established trading routes throughout most of southern Asia; and sent the first direct European maritime trade and diplomatic missions to China and Japan.

In 1415, Portugal acquired the first of its overseas colonies by conquering Ceuta, the first prosperous Islamic trade centre in North Africa. There followed the first discoveries in the Atlantic: Madeira and the Azores, which led to the first colonization movements.

In 1422, by decree of King John I, Portugal officially abandoned the previous dating system, the Era of Caesar, and adopted the Anno Domini system, therefore becoming the last catholic realm to do so.

Throughout the 15th century, Portuguese explorers sailed the coast of Africa, establishing trading posts for several common types of tradable commodities at the time, ranging from gold to slaves, as they looked for a route to India and its spices, which were coveted in Europe.

The Treaty of Tordesillas, intended to resolve the dispute that had been created following the return of Christopher Columbus, was made by Pope Alexander VI, the mediator between Portugal and Spain. It was signed on 7 June 1494, and divided the newly discovered lands outside Europe between the two countries along a meridian 370 leagues west of the Cape Verde islands (off the west coast of Africa).

In 1498, Vasco da Gama accomplished what Columbus set out to do and became the first European to reach India by sea, bringing economic prosperity to Portugal and its population of 1.7 million residents, and helping to start the Portuguese Renaissance. In 1500, the Portuguese explorer Gaspar Corte-Real reached what is now Canada and founded the town of Portugal Cove-St. Philip's, Newfoundland and Labrador, long before the French and English in the 17th century, and being just one of many Portuguese colonizations of the Americas.

In 1500, Pedro Álvares Cabral discovered Brazil and claimed it for Portugal. Ten years later, Afonso de Albuquerque conquered Goa in India, Muscat and Ormuz in the Persian Strait, and Malacca, now a state in Malaysia. Thus, the Portuguese empire held dominion over commerce in the Indian Ocean and South Atlantic. Portuguese sailors set out to reach Eastern Asia by sailing eastward from Europe, landing in such places as Taiwan, Japan, the island of Timor, and in the Moluccas.

Although for a long period it was believed the Dutch were the first Europeans to arrive in Australia, there is also some evidence that the Portuguese may have discovered Australia in 1521. From 1519 to 1522, Ferdinand Magellan (Fernão de Magalhães) organized a Spanish expedition to the East Indies which resulted in the first circumnavigation of the globe. Magellan never made it back to Europe as he was killed by natives in the Philippines in 1521.

The Treaty of Zaragoza, signed on 22 April 1529 between Portugal and Spain, specified the anti-meridian to the line of demarcation specified in the Treaty of Tordesillas.

All these factors made Portugal one of the world's major economic, military, and political powers from the 15th century until the late 16th century.

Iberian Union, Restoration and early Brigantine era 

Portugal voluntarily entered a dynastic union between 1580 and 1640. This occurred because the last two kings of the House of Aviz – King Sebastian, who died in the battle of Alcácer Quibir in Morocco, and his great-uncle and successor, King-Cardinal Henry of Portugal – both died without heirs, resulting in the Portuguese succession crisis of 1580.

Subsequently, Philip II of Spain claimed the throne and was accepted as Philip I of Portugal. Portugal did not lose its formal independence, briefly forming a union of kingdoms. At this time Spain was a geographic territory. The joining of the two crowns deprived Portugal of an independent foreign policy and led to its involvement in the Eighty Years' War between Spain and the Netherlands.

War led to a deterioration of the relations with Portugal's oldest ally, England, and the loss of Hormuz, a strategic trading post located between Iran and Oman. From 1595 to 1663 the Dutch-Portuguese War primarily involved the Dutch companies invading many Portuguese colonies and commercial interests in Brazil, Africa, India and the Far East, resulting in the loss of the Portuguese Indian sea trade monopoly.
In 1640, John IV of Portugal spearheaded an uprising backed by disgruntled nobles and was proclaimed king. The Portuguese Restoration War ended the sixty-year period of the Iberian Union under the House of Habsburg. This was the beginning of the House of Braganza, which reigned in Portugal until 1910.

King John IV's eldest son came to reign as Afonso VI, however his physical and mental disabilities left him overpowered by Luís de Vasconcelos e Sousa, 3rd Count of Castelo Melhor. In a palace coup organized by the King's wife, Maria Francisca of Savoy, and his brother, Pedro, Duke of Beja, King Afonso VI was declared mentally incompetent and exiled first to the Azores and then to the Royal Palace of Sintra, outside Lisbon. After Afonso's death, Pedro came to the throne as King Pedro II. Pedro's reign saw the consolidation of national independence, imperial expansion, and investment in domestic production.

Pedro II's son, John V, saw a reign characterized by the influx of gold into the coffers of the royal treasury, supplied largely by the royal fifth (a tax on precious metals) that was received from the Portuguese colonies of Brazil and Maranhão.

Disregarding traditional Portuguese institutions of governance, John V acted as an absolute monarch, nearly depleting the country's tax revenues on ambitious architectural works, most notably Mafra Palace, and on commissions and additions for his sizeable art and literary collections.

Owing to his craving for international diplomatic recognition, John also spent large sums on the embassies he sent to the courts of Europe, the most famous being those he sent to Paris in 1715 and Rome in 1716.

Official estimates – and most estimates made so far – place the number of Portuguese migrants to Colonial Brazil during the gold rush of the 18th century at 600,000. This represented one of the largest movements of European populations to their colonies in the Americas during colonial times.

Pombaline era and Enlightenment 

In 1738, fidalgo Sebastião José de Carvalho e Melo (later ennobled as the 1st Marquis of Pombal) began a diplomatic career as the Portuguese Ambassador in London and later in Vienna. The Queen consort of Portugal, Archduchess Maria Anna of Austria, was fond of Carvalho e Melo; and after his first wife died, she arranged the widowed Carvalho e Melo's second marriage to the daughter of the Austrian field marshal Leopold Josef, Count von Daun. King John V, however, was not pleased and recalled Carvalho e Melo to Portugal in 1749. John V died the following year and his son, Joseph I, was crowned. In contrast to his father, Joseph I was fond of Carvalho e Melo, and with the Queen Mother's approval, he appointed Carvalho e Melo as Minister of Foreign Affairs.

As the King's confidence in Carvalho e Melo increased, the King entrusted him with more control of the state. By 1755, Sebastião José de Carvalho e Melo was made Prime Minister. Impressed by British economic success that he had witnessed from his time as an Ambassador, he successfully implemented similar economic policies in Portugal. He abolished slavery in mainland Portugal and in the Portuguese colonies in India, reorganized the army and the navy, restructured the University of Coimbra, and ended legal discrimination against different Christian sects in Portugal by abolishing the distinction between Old and New Christians.

Carvalho e Melo's greatest reforms were economic and financial, with the creation of several companies and guilds to regulate every commercial activity. He created one of the first appellation systems in the world by demarcating the region for production of Port to ensure the wine's quality; and this was the first attempt to control wine quality and production in Europe. He ruled with a strong hand by imposing strict law upon all classes of Portuguese society from the high nobility to the poorest working class, along with a widespread review of the country's tax system. These reforms gained him enemies in the upper classes, especially among the high nobility, who despised him as a social upstart.

Disaster fell upon Portugal in the morning of 1 November 1755, when Lisbon was struck by a violent earthquake with an estimated moment magnitude of 8.5–9. The city was razed to the ground by the earthquake and the subsequent tsunami and ensuing fires. Carvalho e Melo survived by a stroke of luck and then immediately embarked on rebuilding the city, with his famous quote: "What now? We bury the dead and take care of the living."

Despite the calamity and huge death toll, Lisbon suffered no epidemics and within less than one year was already being rebuilt. The new city centre of Lisbon was designed to resist subsequent earthquakes. Architectural models were built for tests, and the effects of an earthquake were simulated by having troops march around the models. The buildings and large squares of the Pombaline Downtown still remain as one of Lisbon's tourist attractions. Carvalho e Melo also made an important contribution to the study of seismology by designing a detailed inquiry on the effects of the earthquake, the Parochial Memories of 1758, that was sent to every parish in the country; this wealth of information allows modern scientists to reconstruct the event with some degree of scientific precision while also giving current historians an immense amount of demographic, topographic and prosopographic information on the rest of the kingdom as well as information on its urban and rural areas.

Following the earthquake, Joseph I gave his Prime Minister even more power, and Carvalho de Melo became a powerful, progressive dictator. As his power grew, his enemies increased in number, and bitter disputes with the upper nobility became frequent. In 1758 Joseph I was wounded in an attempted assassination. The Távora family and the Duke of Aveiro were implicated and summarily executed after a quick trial. The following year, the Jesuits were suppressed and expelled from the country and their assets confiscated by the crown. Carvalho e Melo spared none involved, even women and children (notably, eight-year-old Leonor de Almeida Portugal, imprisoned in a convent for nineteen years). This was the final stroke that crushed all opposition by publicly demonstrating even the aristocracy was powerless before the King's loyal minister. Joseph I ennobled Carvalho e Melo as Count of Oeiras in 1759.

In 1762, Spain invaded Portuguese territory as part of the Seven Years' War, but by 1763 the status quo between Spain and Portugal before the war had been restored.

Following the Távora affair, the new Count of Oeiras knew no opposition. Further titled "Marquês de Pombal" in 1770, he effectively ruled Portugal until Joseph I's death in 1777.

The new ruler, Queen Maria I of Portugal, disliked the Marquês de Pombal because of the power he amassed, and never forgave him for the ruthlessness with which he dispatched the Távora family, and upon her accession to the throne, she withdrew all his political offices. The Marquês de Pombal was banished to his estate at Pombal, where he died in 1782.

However, historians also argue that Pombal's "enlightenment," while far-reaching, was primarily a mechanism for enhancing autocracy at the expense of individual liberty and especially an apparatus for crushing opposition, suppressing criticism, and furthering colonial economic exploitation as well as intensifying book censorship and consolidating personal control and profit.

Napoleonic era 

With the invasions by Napoleon, Portugal began a slow but inexorable decline that lasted until the 20th century. This decline was hastened by the independence of Brazil, the country's largest colonial possession.

In the autumn of 1807, Napoleon moved French troops through Spain to invade Portugal. From 1807 to 1811, British-Portuguese forces successfully fought against the French invasion of Portugal in the Peninsular War, during which the royal family and the Portuguese nobility, including Maria I, relocated to the Portuguese territory of Brazil, at that time a colony of the Portuguese Empire, in South America. This episode is known as the Transfer of the Portuguese Court to Brazil.

In 1807, as Napoleon's army closed in on Lisbon, João VI of Portugal, the prince regent, transferred his court to Brazil and established Rio de Janeiro as the capital of the Portuguese Empire. In 1815, Brazil was declared a Kingdom and the Kingdom of Portugal was united with it, forming a pluricontinental state, the United Kingdom of Portugal, Brazil and the Algarves.

As a result of the change in its status and the arrival of the Portuguese royal family, Brazilian administrative, civic, economical, military, educational, and scientific apparatus were expanded and highly modernized. Portuguese and their allied British troops fought against the French Invasion of Portugal and by 1815 the situation in Europe had cooled down sufficiently that João VI would have been able to return safely to Lisbon. However, the King of Portugal remained in Brazil until the Liberal Revolution of 1820, which started in Porto, demanded his return to Lisbon in 1821.

Thus he returned to Portugal but left his son Pedro in charge of Brazil. When the Portuguese Government attempted the following year to return the Kingdom of Brazil to subordinate status, his son Pedro, with the overwhelming support of the Brazilian elites, declared Brazil's independence from Portugal. Cisplatina (today's sovereign state of Uruguay), in the south, was one of the last additions to the territory of Brazil under Portuguese rule.

Brazilian independence was recognized in 1825, whereby Emperor Pedro I granted to his father the titular honour of Emperor of Brazil. John VI's death in 1826 caused serious questions in his succession. Though Pedro was his heir, and reigned briefly as Pedro IV, his status as a Brazilian monarch was seen as an impediment to holding the Portuguese throne by both nations. Pedro abdicated in favour of his daughter, Maria II (Mary II). However, Pedro's brother, Infante Miguel, claimed the throne in protest. After a proposal for Miguel and Maria to marry failed, Miguel seized power as King Miguel I, in 1828. In order to defend his daughter's rights to the throne, Pedro launched the Liberal Wars to reinstall his daughter and establish a constitutional monarchy in Portugal. The war ended in 1834, with Miguel's defeat, the promulgation of a constitution, and the reinstatement of Queen Maria II.

Constitutional monarchy 

Queen Maria II (Mary II) and King Ferdinand II's son, King Pedro V (Peter V) modernized the country during his short reign (1853–1861). Under his reign, roads, telegraphs, and railways were constructed and improvements in public health advanced. His popularity increased when, during the cholera outbreak of 1853–1856, he visited hospitals handing out gifts and comforting the sick. Pedro's reign was short, as he died of cholera in 1861, after a series of deaths in the royal family, including his two brothers Infante Fernando and Infante João, Duke of Beja, and his wife, Stephanie of Hohenzollern-Sigmaringen. Pedro not having children, his brother, Luís I of Portugal (Louis I) ascended the throne and continued his modernization.

At the height of European colonialism in the 19th century, Portugal had already lost its territory in South America and all but a few bases in Asia. Luanda, Benguela, Bissau, Lourenço Marques, Porto Amboim and the Island of Mozambique were among the oldest Portuguese-founded port cities in its African territories. During this phase, Portuguese colonialism focused on expanding its outposts in Africa into nation-sized territories to compete with other European powers there.

With the Conference of Berlin of 1884, Portuguese territories in Africa had their borders formally established on request of Portugal in order to protect the centuries-long Portuguese interests in the continent from rivalries enticed by the Scramble for Africa. Portuguese towns and cities in Africa like Nova Lisboa, Sá da Bandeira, Silva Porto, Malanje, Tete, Vila Junqueiro, Vila Pery and Vila Cabral were founded or redeveloped inland during this period and beyond. New coastal towns like Beira, Moçâmedes, Lobito, João Belo, Nacala and Porto Amélia were also founded. Even before the turn of the 20th century, railway tracks as the Benguela railway in Angola, and the Beira railway in Mozambique, started to be built to link coastal areas and selected inland regions.

Other episodes during this period of the Portuguese presence in Africa include the 1890 British Ultimatum. This forced the Portuguese military to retreat from the land between the Portuguese colonies of Mozambique and Angola (most of present-day Zimbabwe and Zambia), which had been claimed by Portugal and included in its "Pink Map", which clashed with British aspirations to create a Cape to Cairo Railway.

The Portuguese territories in Africa were Cape Verde, São Tomé and Príncipe, Portuguese Guinea, Angola, and Mozambique. The tiny fortress of São João Baptista de Ajudá on the coast of Dahomey, was also under Portuguese rule. In addition, Portugal still ruled the Asian territories of Portuguese India, Portuguese Timor and Portuguese Macau.

On 1 February 1908, King Dom Carlos I of Portugal and his heir apparent and his eldest son, Prince Royal Dom Luís Filipe, Duke of Braganza, were assassinated in Lisbon in the Terreiro do Paço by two Portuguese republican activist revolutionaries, Alfredo Luís da Costa and Manuel Buíça. Under his rule, Portugal had been declared bankrupt twice – first on 14 June 1892, and then again on 10 May 1902 – causing social turmoil, economic disturbances, angry protests, revolts and criticism of the monarchy. His second and youngest son, Manuel II of Portugal, became the new king, but was eventually overthrown by the 5 October 1910 Portuguese republican revolution, which abolished the monarchy and installed a republican government in Portugal, causing him and his royal family to flee into exile in London, England.

First Republic and Estado Novo 

The new republic had many problems. Portugal had 45 different governments in just 15 years. During World War 1 (1914–1918), Portugal helped the Allies fight the Central Powers, however the war hurt its weak economy. Political instability and economic weaknesses were fertile ground for chaos and unrest during the First Portuguese Republic. These conditions would lead to the failed Monarchy of the North, 28 May 1926 coup d'état, and the creation of the National Dictatorship (Ditadura Nacional).
This in turn led to the establishment of the right-wing dictatorship of the Estado Novo under António de Oliveira Salazar in 1933.

Portugal remained neutral in World War II.
From the 1940s to the 1960s, Portugal was a founding member of NATO, OECD and the European Free Trade Association (EFTA). Gradually, new economic development projects and relocation of mainland Portuguese citizens into the overseas provinces in Africa were initiated, with Angola and Mozambique, as the largest and richest overseas territories, being the main targets of those initiatives. These actions were used to affirm Portugal's status as a transcontinental nation and not as a colonial empire.

After India attained independence in 1947, pro-Indian residents of Dadra and Nagar Haveli, with the support of the Indian government and the help of pro-independence organizations, separated the territories of Dadra and Nagar Haveli from Portuguese rule in 1954. In 1961, Fort of São João Baptista de Ajudá's annexation by the Republic of Dahomey was the start of a process that led to the final dissolution of the centuries-old Portuguese Empire.

According to the census of 1921 São João Baptista de Ajudá had five inhabitants and, at the moment of the ultimatum by the Dahomey Government, it had only two inhabitants representing Portuguese Sovereignty.

Another forcible retreat from overseas territories occurred in December 1961 when Portugal refused to relinquish the territories of Goa, Daman and Diu in India. As a result, the Portuguese army and navy were involved in armed conflict in its colony of Portuguese India against the Indian Armed Forces.

The operations resulted in the defeat and surrender of the limited Portuguese defensive garrison, which was forced to surrender to a much larger military force. The outcome was the loss of the remaining Portuguese territories in the Indian subcontinent. The Portuguese regime refused to recognize Indian sovereignty over the annexed territories, which continued to be represented in Portugal's National Assembly until the military coup of 1974.

Also in the early 1960s, independence movements in the Portuguese overseas provinces of Angola, Mozambique and Guinea in Africa, resulted in the Portuguese Colonial War (1961–1974). The war lasted 13 years, mobilized around 1,4 million men for military and/or civilian support service, and led to big casualties from military to civilians, plus evacuations of thousands from war zones.

Throughout the colonial war period Portugal had to deal with increasing dissent, arms embargoes and other punitive sanctions imposed by most of the international community.

Carnation Revolution and European integration 

The Portuguese government and army resisted the decolonization of its overseas territories until April 1974, when a left-wing military coup in Lisbon, known as the Carnation Revolution, led the way for the independence of the overseas territories in Africa and Asia, as well as for the restoration of democracy after two years of a transitional period known as PREC (Processo Revolucionário Em Curso). This period was characterized by social turmoil and power disputes between left- and right-wing political forces. By the summer of 1975, the tension between these was so high, that the country was on the verge of civil war. The forces connected to the extreme left-wing launched a further coup d'état on 25 November but the Group of Nine, a moderate military faction, immediately initiated a counter-coup. The main episode of this confrontation was the successful assault on the barracks of the left-wing dominated Military Police Regiment by the moderate forces of the Commando Regiment, resulting in three soldiers killed in action. The Group of Nine emerged victorious, thus preventing the establishment of a communist state in Portugal and ending the period of political instability in the country. The retreat from the overseas territories and the acceptance of its independence terms by Portuguese head representatives for overseas negotiations, which would create independent states in 1975, prompted a mass exodus of Portuguese citizens from Portugal's African territories (mostly from Portuguese Angola and Mozambique).

Over one million Portuguese refugees fled the former Portuguese provinces as white settlers were usually not considered part of the new identities of the former Portuguese colonies in Africa and Asia. Mário Soares and António de Almeida Santos were charged with organizing the independence of Portugal's overseas territories. By 1975, all the Portuguese African territories were independent and Portugal held its first democratic elections in 50 years.

Portugal continued to be governed by a Junta de Salvação Nacional until the Portuguese legislative election of 1976. It was won by the Portuguese Socialist Party (PS) and Mário Soares, its leader, became Prime Minister of the 1st Constitutional Government on 23 July. Mário Soares would be Prime Minister from 1976 to 1978 and again from 1983 to 1985. In this capacity Soares tried to resume the economic growth and development record that had been achieved before the Carnation Revolution, during the last decade of the previous regime. He initiated the process of accession to the European Economic Community (EEC) by starting accession negotiations as early as 1977.

After the transition to democracy, Portugal bounced between socialism and adherence to the neoliberal model. Land reform and nationalizations were enforced; the Portuguese Constitution (approved in 1976) was rewritten in order to accommodate socialist and communist principles. Until the constitutional revisions of 1982 and 1989, the constitution was a document with numerous references to socialism, the rights of workers, and the desirability of a socialist economy. Portugal's economic situation after the revolution obliged the government to pursue International Monetary Fund (IMF)-monitored stabilization programmes in 1977–78 and 1983–85.

In 1986, Portugal, along with Spain, joined the European Economic Community (EEC) that later became the European Union (EU). In the following years Portugal's economy progressed considerably as a result of EEC/EU structural and cohesion funds and Portuguese companies' easier access to foreign markets.

Portugal's last overseas and Asian colonial territory, Macau, was peacefully handed over to the People's Republic of China (PRC) on 20 December 1999, under the 1987 joint declaration that set the terms for Macau's handover from Portugal to the PRC. In 2002, the independence of East Timor (Asia) was formally recognized by Portugal, after an incomplete decolonization process that was started in 1975 because of the Carnation Revolution, but interrupted by an Indonesian armed invasion and occupation.

On 26 March 1995, Portugal started to implement Schengen Area rules, eliminating border controls with other Schengen members while simultaneously strengthening border controls with non-member states. In 1996 the country was a co-founder of the Community of Portuguese Language Countries (CPLP) headquartered in Lisbon. In 1996, Jorge Sampaio became president. He won re-election in January 2001. Expo '98 took place in Portugal and in 1999 it was one of the founding countries of the euro and the eurozone. On 5 July 2004, José Manuel Barroso, then Prime Minister of Portugal, was nominated President of the European Commission, the most powerful office in the European Union. On 1 December 2009, the Treaty of Lisbon entered into force, after it had been signed by the European Union member states on 13 December 2007 in the Jerónimos Monastery, in Lisbon, enhancing the efficiency and democratic legitimacy of the Union and improving the coherence of its action. Ireland was the only EU state to hold a democratic referendum on the Lisbon Treaty. It was initially rejected by voters in 2008.

Economic disruption and an unsustainable growth in government debt during the financial crisis of 2007–2008 led the country to negotiate in 2011 with the IMF and the European Union, through the European Financial Stability Mechanism (EFSM) and the European Financial Stability Facility (EFSF), a loan to help the country stabilize its finances.

Geography 

Portugal occupies an area on the Iberian Peninsula (referred to as the continent by most Portuguese) and two archipelagos in the Atlantic Ocean: Madeira and the Azores. It lies between latitudes 30° and 42° N, and longitudes 32° and 6° W.

Mainland Portugal is split by its main river, the Tagus, that flows from Spain and disgorges in the Tagus Estuary at Lisbon, before escaping into the Atlantic. The northern landscape is mountainous towards the interior with several plateaus indented by river valleys, whereas the south, including the Algarve and the Alentejo regions, is characterized by rolling plains.

Portugal's highest peak is the similarly named Mount Pico on the island of Pico in the Azores.

The archipelagos of Madeira and the Azores are scattered within the Atlantic Ocean: the Azores straddling the Mid-Atlantic Ridge on a tectonic triple junction, and Madeira along a range formed by in-plate hotspot geology. Geologically, these islands were formed by volcanic and seismic events. The last terrestrial volcanic eruption occurred in 1957–58 (Capelinhos) and minor earthquakes occur sporadically, usually of low intensity.

This is the 3rd largest exclusive economic zone of the European Union and the 20th largest in the world.

Climate 

Portugal is mainly characterized by a Mediterranean climate (Csa in the South, central interior, and the Douro river valley; Csb in the North, Central west and Vicentine Coast), temperate maritime climate (Cfb) in the mainland north-western highlands and mountains, and in some high altitude zones of the Azorean islands; a semi-arid climate in certain parts of the Beja District far south (BSk) and in Porto Santo Island (BSh), a warm desert climate (BWh) in the Selvagens Islands and a humid subtropical climate in the western Azores (Cfa), according to the Köppen-Geiger Climate Classification. There are however, variations from the highlands to the lowlands: Spanish biologist Salvador Rivas Martinez presents several different bioclimatic zones for Portugal.

Snowfalls occur regularly in the winter in the interior North and Centre of the country in districts such as Guarda, Bragança, Viseu and Vila Real, particularly on the mountains. In winter, temperatures may drop below , particularly in Serra da Estrela, Serra do Gerês, Serra do Marão and Serra de Montesinho. In these places snow can fall any time from October to May. In the South of the country snowfalls are rare but still occur in the highest elevations.

Continental Portugal receives around 2,300 to 3,200 hours of sunshine a year, an average of 4–6 hours in winter and 10–12 hours in the summer, with higher values in the south-east, south-west and the Algarve coast and lower in the north-west. Insolation values are lower in the archipelagos, with around 1,600 hours in the humid Flores Island and around 2,300 hours in the island of Madeira and Porto Santo. Insolation in the Selvagens is thought to be higher due to weaker orographic lift and their relative proximity to the Sahara Desert.

Portugal's central west and southwest coasts have an extreme ocean seasonal lag, sea temperatures are warmer in October than in July and are their coldest in March.

Both the archipelagos of the Azores and Madeira have a subtropical climate, although variations between islands exist, making weather predictions very difficult (owing to rough topography). The Madeira and Azorean archipelagos have a narrower temperature range, with annual average temperatures exceeding  in some parts of the coast (according to the Portuguese Meteorological Institute). Some islands in Azores do have drier months in the summer. Consequently, the islands of the Azores have been identified as having a Mediterranean climate (both Csa and Csb types), while some islands (such as Flores or Corvo) are classified as Humid subtropical (Cfa), transitioning into an Oceanic climate (Cfb) at higher altitudes, according to Köppen-Geiger classification.

Porto Santo Island in Madeira has a warm semi-arid climate (BSh).

Biodiversity 

Portugal is located on the Mediterranean Basin, the third most diverse hotspot of flora in the world. Due to its geographical and climatic context - between the Atlantic and Mediterranean - Portugal has a high level of biodiversity on land and at sea. It is home to six terrestrial ecoregions: Azores temperate mixed forests, Cantabrian mixed forests, Madeira evergreen forests, Iberian sclerophyllous and semi-deciduous forests, Northwest Iberian montane forests, and Southwest Iberian Mediterranean sclerophyllous and mixed forests. Over 22% of its land area is included in the Natura 2000 network, including 62 special conservation areas and 88 types of protected landscape natural habitats.

Eucalyptus (non-native, commercial plantations), cork oak and maritime pine together make up 71% of the total forested area of continental Portugal, followed by the holm oak, the stone pine, the other oak trees (Q. robur, Q. faginea and Q. pyrenaica) and the sweet chestnut, respectively. In Madeira, laurisilva (recognized as a World Heritage Site) dominates the landscape, especially on the northern slope. The predominant species in this forest include Laurus novocanariensis, Apollonias barbujana, Ocotea foetens and Persea indica. Before human occupation the Azores were also rich in dense laurisilva forests, today these native forests are undermined by the introduced Pittosporum undulatum and Cryptomeria japonica. There have been several projects aimed to recover the Laurisilva present in the Azores. Remnants of these laurisilva forests are also present in continental Portugal with its few living testimonies Laurus nobilis, Prunus lusitanica, Arbutus unedo, Myrica faya and Rhododendron ponticum.

These geographical and climatic conditions facilitate the introduction of exotic species that later turn to be invasive and destructive to the native habitats. Around 20% of the total number of extant species in continental Portugal are exotic. In Madeira, around 36% and in the Azores, around 70% species are exotic. Due to this, Portugal was placed 168th globally out of 172 countries on the Forest Landscape Integrity Index in 2019.

Portugal is the second country in Europe with the highest number of threatened animal and plant species (488 as of 2020).

Portugal as a whole is an important stopover for migratory bird species: the southern marshes of the eastern Algarve (Ria Formosa, Castro Marim) and the Lisbon Region (Tagus Estuary, Sado Estuary) hosting various aquatic bird species, the Bonelli's eagle and Egyptian vulture on the northern valleys of the Douro International, the black stork and griffon vulture on the Tagus International, the seabird sanctuaries of the Savage Islands and Berlengas and the highlands of Madeira and São Miguel all represent the great diversity of wild avian species (around 450 in continental Portugal), not only migratory but also endemic (e.g. trocaz pigeon, Azores bullfinch) or exotic (crested myna, pin-tailed whydah).

The large mammalian species of Portugal (the fallow deer, red deer, roe deer, Iberian ibex, wild boar, red fox, Iberian wolf and Iberian lynx) were once widespread throughout the country, but intense hunting, habitat degradation and growing pressure from agriculture and livestock reduced population numbers on a large scale in the 19th and early 20th century, others, such as the Portuguese ibex were even led to extinction. Today, these animals are re-expanding their native range. Smaller mammals include the red squirrel, European badger, Eurasian otter, Egyptian mongoose, Granada hare, European rabbit, common genet, European wildcat, among others.

Due to their isolated location, the volcanic islands of the Azores, Madeira and Salvages, part of Macaronesia, have many endemic species that have evolved independently from their European, African and occasionally American relatives.

The Portuguese west coast is part of the four major Eastern Boundary Upwelling Systems of the ocean. This seasonal upwelling system typically seen during the summer months brings cooler, nutrient rich water up to the sea surface promoting phytoplankton growth, zooplankton development and the subsequent rich diversity in pelagic fish and other marine invertebrates.

This, adding to its large EEZ makes Portugal one of the largest per capita fish-consumers in the world. Sardines (Sardina pilchardus) and horse mackerel (Trachurus trachurus) are collected in the thousands every year. while blue whiting, monkfish, Atlantic cod, cephalopods, skates or any other form of seafood are traditionally fished in the local coastal villages. This upwelling also allows Portugal to have kelp forests which are otherwise very uncommon or non-existent on the Mediterranean.

73% of the freshwater fish occurring in the Iberian Peninsula are endemic, the largest out of any region in Europe. Many of these endemic species are concentrated in bodies of water of the central western region (one exclusively endemic), these and other bodies of water throughout the Peninsula are mostly temporary and prone to drought every year, placing most of these species under Threatened status.

Around 24 to 28 species of cetacean roam through the Azores, making it one of four places in the world where most species of this infraorder occur. Starting in the mid-19th century and ceasing in 1984, whaling (especially of sperm whale) heavily exploited this diversity. Beginning in the early 90s, whale watching quickly grew to popularity and is now one of the main economic activities in the Portuguese archipelago.

Some protected areas in Portugal other than the ones previously mentioned include: the Serras de Aire e Candeeiros with its limestone formations, paleontological history and great diversity in bats and orchids, the Southwest Alentejo and Vicentine Coast Natural Park with its well preserved, wild coastline. the Montesinho Natural Park which hosts some of the only populations of Iberian wolf and recent sightings of Iberian brown bear, which had been considered extinct in the country; among other species.

Government and politics 

Portugal has been a semi-presidential representative democratic republic since the ratification of the Constitution of 1976, with Lisbon, the nation's largest city, as its capital. The Constitution grants the division or separation of powers among four : the President of the Republic, the Government, the Assembly of the Republic and the Courts.

The President, who is elected to a five-year term, has an executive role: the current President is Marcelo Rebelo de Sousa. The Assembly of the Republic is a single chamber parliament composed of a maximum of 230 deputies elected for a four-year term. The Government is headed by the Prime Minister (currently António Costa) and includes Ministers and Secretaries of State. The Courts are organized into several levels, among the judicial, administrative and fiscal branches. The Supreme Courts are institutions of last resort/appeal. A thirteen-member Constitutional Court oversees the constitutionality of the laws.

Portugal operates a multi-party system of competitive legislatures/local administrative governments at the national, regional and local levels. The Assembly of the Republic, Regional Assemblies and local municipalities and parishes, are dominated by two political parties, the Socialist Party and the Social Democratic Party, in addition to Enough, the Liberal Initiative, the Unitary Democratic Coalition (Portuguese Communist Party and Ecologist Party "The Greens") and the Left Bloc, which garner between 5 and 15% of the vote regularly.

Presidency of the Republic 

The Head of State of Portugal is the President of the Republic, elected to a five-year term by direct, universal suffrage. Presidential powers include the appointment of the Prime Minister and the other members of the Government (where the President takes into account the results of legislative elections); dismissing the Prime Minister; dissolving the Assembly of the Republic (to call early elections); vetoing legislation (which may be overridden by the Assembly); and declaring a state of war or siege. The President has also supervisory and reserve powers and is the ex officio Commander-in-Chief of the Armed Forces.

The President is advised on issues of importance by the Council of State, which is composed of six senior civilian officers, any former Presidents elected under the 1976 Constitution, five members chosen by the Assembly, and five selected by the president.

Government 

The Government is headed by the presidentially appointed Prime Minister, also including one or more Deputy Prime Ministers, Ministers, Secretaries of State and Under-Secretaries of State.

The Government is both the organ of sovereignty that conducts the general politics of the country and the superior body of the public administration.

It has essentially Executive powers, but has also limited legislative powers. The Government can legislate about its own organization, about areas covered by legislative authorizations conceded by the Assembly of the Republic and about the specific regulation of generalist laws issued by the Assembly.

The Council of Ministers – under the presidency of the Prime Minister (or the President of Portugal at the latter's request) and the Ministers (may also include one or more Deputy Prime Ministers) – acts as the cabinet. Each government is required to define the broad outline of its policies in a programme, and present it to the Assembly for a mandatory period of debate. The failure of the Assembly to reject the government programme by an absolute majority of deputies confirms the cabinet in office.

Parliament 

The Assembly of the Republic, in Lisbon, is the national parliament of Portugal. It is the main legislative body, although the Government also has limited legislative powers.

The Assembly of the Republic is a unicameral body composed of up to 230 deputies. Elected by universal suffrage according to a system of closed party-list proportional representation, deputies serve four-year terms of office, unless the President dissolves the Assembly and calls for new elections.

Currently the Government (PS) has an absolute majority of seats in Parliament. The PSD is the main opposition party, alongside Chega, Liberal Initiative, BE, PCP, PAN and Livre.

Foreign relations 

A member state of the United Nations since 1955, Portugal is also a founding member of NATO (1949), OECD (1961) and EFTA (1960); it left the last in 1986 to join the European Economic Community, which became the European Union in 1993.

In 1996, Portugal co-founded the Community of Portuguese Language Countries (CPLP), also known as the Lusophone Commonwealth, an international organization and political association of Lusophone nations across four continents, where Portuguese is an official language. The global headquarters of the CPLP is in Penafiel Palace, in Lisbon.

António Guterres, who has served as Prime Minister of Portugal from 1995 to 2002 and UN High Commissioner for Refugees from 2005 to 2015, assumed the post of UN Secretary-General on 1 January 2017; making him the first Secretary-General from Western Europe since Kurt Waldheim of Austria (1972–1981), the first former head of government to become Secretary-General and the first Secretary-General born after the establishment of the United Nations on 26 June 1945.

In addition, Portugal was a full member of the Latin Union (1983) and the Organization of Ibero-American States (1949). It has a friendship alliance and dual citizenship treaty with its former colony, Brazil. Portugal and the United Kingdom share the world's oldest active military accord through their Anglo-Portuguese Alliance (Treaty of Windsor), which was signed in 1373.

There are two international territorial disputes, both with Spain:
 Olivenza. Under Portuguese sovereignty since 1297, the municipality of Olivenza was ceded to Spain under the Treaty of Badajoz in 1801, after the War of the Oranges. Portugal claimed it back in 1815 under the Treaty of Vienna. However, since the 19th century, it has been continuously ruled by Spain which considers the territory theirs not only de facto but also de jure.
 The Ilhas Selvagens (Savage Islands). The archipelago is under Portuguese domination but is geographically closer to the Canary Islands (165 km) than to Madeira (280 km). Found in 1364 by Italian navigators, the islands belonged to private owners until 1971, when the Portuguese government bought them and established a natural reserve area covering the whole archipelago. The islands have been claimed by Spain since 1911 and the dispute has caused some periods of political tension between the two countries. The main problem is not so much their intrinsic value but the fact that they expand the Exclusive Economic Zone of Portugal considerably to the south.

Military 

The armed forces have three branches: Navy, Army and Air Force. They serve primarily as a self-defence force whose mission is to protect the territorial integrity of the country and provide humanitarian assistance and security at home and abroad. , the three branches numbered 39,200 active personnel including 7,500 women. Portuguese military expenditure in 2009 was 5 billion US$, representing 2.1 per cent of GDP. Military conscription was abolished in 2004. The minimum age for voluntary recruitment is 18 years.

The Army (21,000 personnel) comprises three brigades and other small units. An infantry brigade (mainly equipped with Pandur II APC), a mechanized brigade (mainly equipped with Leopard 2 A6 tanks and M113 APC) and a Rapid Reaction Brigade (consisting of paratroopers, commandos and rangers). The Navy (10,700 personnel, of which 1,580 are marines), the world's oldest surviving naval force, has five frigates, seven corvettes, two submarines, and 28 patrol and auxiliary vessels. The Air Force (7,500 personnel) has the Lockheed F-16 Fighting Falcon as the main combat aircraft.

In addition to the three branches of the armed forces, there is the National Republican Guard, a security force subject to military law and organization (gendarmerie) comprising 25,000 personnel. This force is under the authority of both the Defence and the Interior Ministry. It has provided detachments for participation in international operations in Iraq and East Timor.

The United States maintains a military presence with 770 troops in the Lajes Air Base at Terceira Island, in the Azores. The Allied Joint Force Command Lisbon (JFC Lisbon) – one of the three main subdivisions of NATO's Allied Command Operations – it is based in Oeiras, near Lisbon.

In the 20th century, Portugal engaged in two major conflicts: World War I and the Portuguese Colonial War (1961–1974). After the end of the Portuguese Empire in 1975, the Portuguese Armed Forces have participated in peacekeeping missions in East Timor, Bosnia, Kosovo, Afghanistan, Somalia, Iraq (Nasiriyah), Lebanon, Mali and Central African Republic. Portugal also conducted several independent unilateral military operations abroad, as were the cases of the interventions of the Portuguese Armed Forces in Angola in 1992 and in Guinea-Bissau in 1998 with the main objectives of protecting and withdrawing of Portuguese and foreign citizens threatened by local civil conflicts.

Law 

The Portuguese legal system is part of the civil law legal system, also called the continental family legal system. The main laws include the Constitution (1976, as amended), the Portuguese Civil Code (1966, as amended) and the Penal Code of Portugal (1982, as amended). Other relevant laws are the Commercial Code (1888, as amended) and the Civil Procedure Code (1961, as amended).

The supreme national courts are the Supreme Court of Justice and the Constitutional Court. The Public Ministry, headed by the Attorney General of the Republic, constitutes the independent body of public prosecutors.

Portuguese laws were applied in the former colonies and territories and continue to be major influences for those countries.

Portugal was the first country in the world to abolish life imprisonment (in 1884) and was one of the first countries to abolish the death penalty. Maximum prison sentences are limited to 25 years.

Portugal is also known for having decriminalized the usage of all common drugs in 2001, the first country in the world to do so. Portugal decriminalized possession of effectively all drugs that are still illegal in other developed nations including cannabis, cocaine, heroin, and LSD. While possession is legal, trafficking and possession of more than "10 days worth of personal use" are still punishable by jail time and fines. People caught with small amounts of any drug are given the choice to go to a rehab facility, and may refuse treatment without consequences. Despite criticism from other European nations, who stated Portugal's drug consumption would tremendously increase, overall drug use has declined along with the number of HIV infection cases, which had dropped 50 percent by 2009. Drug use among 16- to 18-year-olds also declined, however the use of marijuana rose only slightly among that age group.

LGBTI rights have increased substantially in the past years. On 27 August 2003, Portugal added the anti-discrimination employment law on the basis of sexual orientation. At 24 July 2004, sexual orientation was added to the Constitution as part of the protected from discrimination characteristics. On 31 May 2010, Portugal became the sixth country in Europe and the eighth country in the world to legally recognize same-sex marriage at the national level. The law came into force on 5 June 2010. Same-sex adoption has been allowed since 1 March 2016 as is female same-sex couple access to medically assisted reproduction since 13 May 2016. This bill was adopted by the Parliament and signed by President Marcelo Rebelo de Sousa. As of January 2017 the New Law of Gender Identity, simplified the legal process of gender and name change for transgender people, making it easier for minors to change their sex marker in legal documents. At August 2018, the right to gender identity and gender expression self-determination became protected, intersex minors became protected by law from unnecessary medical procedures "until the minor gender identity manifests" and the right of protection from discrimination on the basis of sex characteristics also became protected by the same law.

Law enforcement 

Portugal's main police organizations are the Guarda Nacional Republicana – GNR (National Republican Guard), a gendarmerie; the Polícia de Segurança Pública – PSP (Public Security Police), a civilian police force who work in urban areas; and the Polícia Judiciária – PJ (Judicial Police), a highly specialized criminal investigation police that is overseen by the Public Ministry.

Correctional services 
Portugal has 49 correctional facilities in total run by the Ministry of Justice. They include seventeen central prisons, four special prisons, twenty-seven regional prisons, and one 'Cadeia de Apoio' (Support Detention Centre). , their current prison population is about 11,234 inmates, which comes to about 0.11% of their entire population. Their incarceration rate has been on the rise since 2010, with a 15% increase over the past eight years.

Administrative divisions 

Administratively, Portugal is divided into 308 municipalities, which after a reform in 2013 are subdivided into 3,092 civil parishes. Operationally, the municipality and civil parish, along with the national government, are the only legally local administrative units identified by the government of Portugal (for example, cities, towns or villages have no standing in law, although may be used as catchment for the defining services). For statistical purposes the Portuguese government also identifies Nomenclature of Territorial Units for Statistics (NUTS), inter-municipal communities and informally, the district system, used until European integration (and being phased-out by the national government). Continental Portugal is agglomerated into 18 districts, while the archipelagos of the Azores and Madeira are governed as autonomous regions; the largest units, established since 1976, are either mainland Portugal and the autonomous regions of Portugal (Azores and Madeira).

The 18 districts of mainland Portugal are: Aveiro, Beja, Braga, Bragança, Castelo Branco, Coimbra, Évora, Faro, Guarda, Leiria, Lisbon, Portalegre, Porto, Santarém, Setúbal, Viana do Castelo, Vila Real and Viseu – each district takes the name of the district capital.

Within the European Union NUTS system, Portugal is divided into seven regions: the Azores, Alentejo, Algarve, Centro, Lisboa, Madeira and Norte, and with the exception of the Azores and Madeira, NUTS areas are subdivided into 28 subregions.

Government finance 

The Portuguese government is heavily indebted, and received a 78-billion-euro bailout from the European Union and the International Monetary Fund in May 2011. The ratio of Portugal's debt to its overall economy, was 107 per cent when it received the bailout. As part of the deal, the country agreed to cut its budget deficit from 9.8 per cent of GDP in 2010 to 5.9 per cent in 2011, 4.5 per cent in 2012 and 3 per cent in 2013.

After the bailout was announced, the Portuguese government headed by Pedro Passos Coelho managed to implement measures with the intention of improving the state's financial situation, including tax hikes, a freeze of civil service-related lower-wages and cuts of higher-wages by 14.3%, on top of the government's spending cuts. The Portuguese government also agreed to eliminate its golden share in Portugal Telecom which gave it veto power over vital decisions. In 2012, all public servants had already seen an average wage cut of 20% relative to their 2010 baseline, with cuts reaching 25% for those earning more than 1,500 euro per month.

The IMF, the European Commission (EC) and the European Central Bank (ECB) said in September 2012 that Portugal's debt would peak at 124 per cent of gross domestic product in 2014. The IMF previously said in July 2012 that Portugal's debt would peak at about 118.5 per cent of GDP in 2013. In September 2013, the Portuguese Government reviewed again the public debt of Portugal for 2013 to 127.8 per cent, after a peak of 130.9 per cent in that month.

A report released in January 2011 by the Diário de Notícias and published in Portugal by Gradiva, had demonstrated that in the period between the Carnation Revolution in 1974 and 2010, the democratic Portuguese Republic governments encouraged over-expenditure and investment bubbles through unclear Public–private partnerships and funding of numerous ineffective and unnecessary external consultancy and advisory of committees and firms.
This allowed considerable slippage in state-managed public works and inflated top management and head officer bonuses and wages. Persistent and lasting recruitment policies boosted the number of redundant public servants. Risky credit, public debt creation, and European structural and cohesion funds were mismanaged across almost four decades.

Two Portuguese banks, Banco Português de Negócios (BPN) and Banco Privado Português (BPP), had been accumulating losses for years due to bad investments, embezzlement and accounting fraud. The case of BPN was particularly serious because of its size, market share, and the political implications – Portugal's then President, Cavaco Silva and some of his political allies, maintained personal and business relationships with the bank and its CEO, who was eventually charged and arrested for fraud and other crimes. On grounds of avoiding a potentially serious financial crisis in the Portuguese economy, the Portuguese government decided to give them a bailout, eventually at a future loss to taxpayers and to the Portuguese people in general.

Economy

Portugal is a developed and a high-income country, with a GDP per capita of 74% of the EU27 average in 2021 (a decrease from 76% in 2012) and a HDI of 0.866 (the 38th highest) in 2021. By the end of 2021, Portugal's GDP (PPP) was $36,381 per capita, according to OECD's report. The national currency of Portugal is the euro (€), which replaced the Portuguese Escudo in 2002, and the country was one of the original member states of the eurozone. Portugal's central bank is the Banco de Portugal, an integral part of the European System of Central Banks. Most industries, businesses and financial institutions are concentrated in the Lisbon and Porto metropolitan areas – the Setúbal, Aveiro, Braga, Coimbra, Leiria and Faro districts are the biggest economic centres outside these two main areas.
According to World Travel Awards, Portugal was Europe's Leading Golf Destination in 2012 and 2013.

Since the Carnation Revolution of 1974, which culminated in the end of one of Portugal's most notable phases of economic expansion (that started in the 1960s), a significant change has occurred in the nation's annual economic growth. After the turmoil of the 1974 revolution and the PREC period, Portugal tried to adapt to a changing modern global economy, a process that continues in 2013. Since the 1990s, Portugal's public consumption-based economic development model has been slowly changing to a system that is focused on exports, private investment and the development of the high-tech sector. Consequently, business services have overtaken more traditional industries such as textiles, clothing, footwear and cork (Portugal is the world's leading cork producer), wood products and beverages.

In the second decade of the 21st century, the Portuguese economy suffered its most severe recession since the 1970s, resulting in the country having to be bailed out by the European Commission, European Central Bank and International Monetary Fund (IMF). The bailout, agreed to in 2011, required Portugal to enter into a range of austerity measures in exchange for funding support of €78,000,000,000. In May 2014, the country exited the bailout but reaffirmed its commitment to maintaining its reformist momentum. At the time of exiting the bailout, the economy had contracted by 0.7% in the first quarter of 2014; however, unemployment, while still high, had fallen to 15.3%.

The average salary in Portugal is €1,039 per month, excluding self-employed individuals and the minimum wage, which is regulated by law, is €705 per month (paid 14 times per annum) as of 2022.

The Global Competitiveness Report for 2019, published by the World Economic Forum, placed Portugal on the 34th position on the economic index.

The Economist Intelligence Unit's quality of life index placed Portugal as the country with the 19th-best quality of life in the world for 2005, ahead of other economically and technologically advanced countries like France, Germany, the United Kingdom and South Korea, but nine places behind its sole neighbour, Spain. This is despite the fact that Portugal remains as one of the countries with the lowest per capita GDP in Western Europe.

Major state-owned companies include: Águas de Portugal (water), Caixa Geral de Depósitos (banking), Comboios de Portugal (railways), Companhia das Lezírias (agriculture) and RTP (media). Some former state-owned entities are managed by state-run holding company Parpública, which is a shareholder of several public and private companies. Among former state-owned companies recently privatized are: CTT (postal service) and ANA (airports).

Companies listed on Euronext Lisbon stock exchange like EDP, Galp, Jerónimo Martins, Mota-Engil, Novabase, Semapa, Portucel Soporcel, Portugal Telecom and Sonae, are amongst the largest corporations of Portugal by number of employees, net income or international market share. The Euronext Lisbon is the major stock exchange of Portugal and is part of the NYSE Euronext, the first global stock exchange. The PSI-20 is Portugal's most selective and widely known stock index.

The International Monetary Fund issued an update report on the economy of Portugal in late-June 2017 with a strong near-term outlook and an increase in investments and exports over previous years. Because of a surplus in 2016, the country was no longer bound by the Excessive Deficit Procedure which had been implemented during an earlier financial crisis. The banking system was more stable, although there were still non-performing loans and corporate debt. The IMF recommended working on solving these problems for Portugal to be able to attract more private investment. "Sustained strong growth, together with continued public debt reduction, would reduce vulnerabilities arising from high indebtedness, particularly when monetary accommodation is reduced."
The OECD economic reports since 2018 show recovery, albeit slow; and Portugal's growth prospects continue positive for 2020.

In recent years, rents and house prices have skyrocketed in Portugal, which is among the poorest countries in Europe, with 50% of workers earring less than 1,000 euros per month.   In Lisbon, rents jumped 37% in 2022.  Portugal's 8.3% inflation rate in the same year exacerbated the problem.

Primary sector 

Agriculture in Portugal is based on small to medium-sized family-owned dispersed units. However, the sector also includes larger scale intensive farming export-oriented agrobusinesses backed by companies (like Grupo RAR's Vitacress, Sovena, Lactogal, Vale da Rosa, Companhia das Lezírias and Valouro). The country produces a wide variety of crops and livestock products, including: tomatoes, citrus, green vegetables, rice, wheat, barley, maize, olives, oilseeds, nuts, cherries, bilberry, table grapes, edible mushrooms, dairy products, poultry and beef. According to FAO, Portugal is the top producer of cork and carob in the world, accounting to about 50% and 30% of world production, respectively. It is also the third largest exporter of chestnuts and the third largest European producer of pulp. Portugal is among the top ten largest olive oil producers in the world and is the fourth largest exporter. The country is also one of the world's largest exporters of wine, being reputed for its fine wines.

Forestry has also played an important economic role among the rural communities and industry (namely paper industry that includes Portucel Soporcel Group, engineered wood that includes Sonae Indústria, and furniture that includes several manufacturing plants in and around Paços de Ferreira, the core of Portugal's major industrial operations of IKEA). In 2001, the gross agricultural product accounted for 4% of the national GDP.

Traditionally a sea power, Portugal has had a strong tradition in the Portuguese fishing sector and is one of the countries with the highest fish consumption per capita. The main landing sites in Portugal (including Azores and Madeira), according to total landings in weight by year, are the harbours of Matosinhos, Peniche, Olhão, Sesimbra, Figueira da Foz, Sines, Portimão and Madeira. Portuguese-processed fish products are exported through several companies, under a number of different brands and registered trademarks, such as Ramirez, the world's oldest active canned fish producer.

Portugal is a significant European minerals producer and is ranked among Europe's leading copper producers. The nation is also a notable producer of tin, tungsten and uranium. However, the country lacks the potential to conduct hydrocarbon exploration and aluminium, a limitation that has hindered the development of Portugal's mining and metallurgy sectors. Although the country has vast iron and coal reserves – mainly in the north – after the 1974 revolution and the consequent economic globalization, low competitiveness forced a decrease in the extraction activity for these minerals. The Panasqueira and Neves-Corvo mines are among the most recognized Portuguese mines that are still in operation.

Portugal is rich in its lithium subsoil, which is especially concentrated in the districts of Guarda, Viseu, Vila Real and Viana do Castelo, while most of the country's lithium comes from the Gonçalo aplite-pegmatite field. The largest lithium mine in Europe is operated by Grupo Mota, Felmica, in the Guarda region, which is estimated to have reserves for 30 years of production. It has five more deposits in its possession. Savannah Resources in May 2018 announced a 52% increase in the estimated lithium resources at the Mina do Barroso Lithium Project in northern Portugal, saying the country could become the first European supplier of spodumene, a lithium-bearing mineral. The company said the estimated mineral resources at the mine now stood at 14 million tonnes. Lithium prices have risen in expectation of growing demand for the mineral, which is used in batteries for electric vehicles and for storing electricity from the power grid. Europe consumes more than 20 per cent of the global supply of battery-grade lithium but currently has to import all its supplies of the mineral.

W Resources stated in 2018 that it had started a new drilling campaign at its São Martinho gold project in Portugal. The objective is to extend resources by integrating the data from 2016 drilling results with the expansion expected with the ongoing campaign.

Secondary sector 

Industry is diversified, ranging from automotive (Volkswagen Autoeuropa and Peugeot Citroën) and bicycles, aerospace (Embraer and OGMA), electronics and textiles, to food, chemicals, cement and wood pulp. Volkswagen Group's AutoEuropa motor vehicle assembly plant in Palmela is among the largest foreign direct investment projects in Portugal.
Modern non-traditional technology-based industries, such as aerospace, biotechnology and information technology, have been developed in several locations across the country. Alverca, Évora and Ponte de Sor are the main centres of the Portuguese aerospace industry, which is led by Brazil-based company Embraer and the Portuguese company OGMA. Following the turn of the 21st century, many major biotechnology and information technology industries have been founded, and are concentrated in the metropolitan areas of Lisbon, Porto, Braga, Coimbra and Aveiro.

Tertiary sector 

The banking and insurance sectors performed well until the financial crisis of 2007–2008, and this partly reflected a rapid deepening of the market in Portugal. While sensitive to various types of market and underwriting risks, it has been estimated that overall both the life and non-life sectors will be able to withstand a number of severe shocks, even though the impact on individual insurers varies widely.

Travel and tourism continue to be extremely important for Portugal. It has been necessary for the country to focus upon its niche attractions, such as health, nature and rural tourism, to stay ahead of its competitors.

Portugal is among the top 20 most-visited countries in the world, receiving an average of 20,000,000 foreign tourists each year. In 2014, Portugal was elected The Best European Country by USA Today.

In 2017, Portugal was elected both Europe's Leading Destination and in 2018 and 2019, World's Leading Destination 

Tourist hotspots in Portugal are: Lisbon, Cascais, Fatima, Algarve, Madeira, Porto and Coimbra. Lisbon attracts the sixteenth-most tourists among European cities (with seven million tourists occupying the city's hotels in 2006). Notable luxury destinations include the Portuguese Riviera and the Comporta Coast.

Also, between 5–6 million religious pilgrims visit Fatima each year, where apparitions of the Virgin Mary to three shepherd children allegedly took place in 1917. The Sanctuary of Our Lady of Fatima is one of the largest Roman Catholic shrines in the world. The Portuguese government continues to promote and develop new tourist destinations, such as the Douro Valley, the island of Porto Santo, and Alentejo.

The legend of the Rooster of Barcelos tells the story of a dead rooster's miraculous intervention in proving the innocence of a man who had been falsely accused and sentenced to death. The story is associated with the 17th-century calvary that is part of the collection of the Archaeological Museum located in Paço dos Condes, a gothic-style palace in Barcelos, a city in northwest Portugal.
The Rooster of Barcelos is bought by thousands of tourists as a national souvenir.

On 30 November 2016, the United Nations added the Portuguese  tradition of making black pottery to the UNESCO Heritage Protection List.
On 7 December 2017, the United Nations added the Bonecos de Estremoz – Toys of Estremoz tradition as an UNESCO Intangible Cultural Heritage of Humankind.

Quaternary sector

Scientific and technological research activities in Portugal are mainly conducted within a network of R&D units belonging to public universities and state-managed autonomous research institutions like the INETI – Instituto Nacional de Engenharia, Tecnologia e Inovação and the INRB – Instituto Nacional dos Recursos Biológicos. The funding and management of this research system is mainly conducted under the authority of the Ministry of Science, Technology and Higher Education (MCTES) and the MCTES's Fundação para a Ciência e Tecnologia (FCT).

The largest R&D units of the public universities by volume of research grants and peer-reviewed publications, include biosciences research institutions like the Instituto de Medicina Molecular, the Centre for Neuroscience and Cell Biology, the IPATIMUP, the Instituto de Biologia Molecular e Celular and the Abel Salazar Biomedical Sciences Institute.

Among the largest non-state-run research institutions in Portugal are the Instituto Gulbenkian de Ciência and the Champalimaud Foundation, a neuroscience and oncology research centre which awards every year one of the highest monetary prizes of any science prize in the world. A number of both national and multinational high-tech and industrial companies, are also responsible for research and development projects. One of the oldest learned societies of Portugal is the Sciences Academy of Lisbon, founded in 1779.

Iberian bilateral state-supported research efforts include the International Iberian Nanotechnology Laboratory and the Ibercivis distributed computing platform, which are joint research programmes of both Portugal and Spain. Portugal is a member of several pan-European scientific organizations. These include the European Space Agency (ESA), the European Laboratory for Particle Physics (CERN), ITER, and the European Southern Observatory (ESO).

Portugal has the largest aquarium in Europe, the Lisbon Oceanarium, and the Portuguese have several other notable organizations focused on science-related exhibits and divulgation, like the state agency Ciência Viva, a programme of the Portuguese Ministry of Science and Technology to the promotion of a scientific and technological culture among the Portuguese population, the Science Museum of the University of Coimbra, the National Museum of Natural History at the University of Lisbon, and the Visionarium.
With the emergence and growth of several science parks throughout the world that helped create many thousands of scientific, technological and knowledge-based businesses, Portugal started to develop several science parks across the country. These include the Taguspark (in Oeiras), the Coimbra iParque (in Coimbra), the biocant (in Cantanhede), the Madeira Tecnopolo (in Funchal), Sines Tecnopolo (in Sines), Tecmaia (in Maia) and Parkurbis (in Covilhã). Companies locate in the Portuguese science parks to take advantage of a variety of services ranging from financial and legal advice through to marketing and technological support.

Egas Moniz, a Portuguese physician who developed the cerebral angiography and leucotomy, received in 1949 the Nobel Prize in Physiology or Medicine – he is the first Portuguese recipient of a Nobel Prize and the only in the sciences.

The European Innovation Scoreboard 2011, placed Portugal-based innovation in the 15th position, with an impressive increase in innovation expenditure and output. Portugal was ranked 31st in the Global Innovation Index in 2021, up from 32nd in 2019.

Transport 

By the early-1970s, Portugal's fast economic growth with increasing consumption and purchase of new automobiles set the priority for improvements in transportation. Again in the 1990s, after joining the European Economic Community, the country built many new motorways. Today, the country has a  road network, of which almost  are part of system of 44 motorways. Opened in 1944, the first motorway (which linked Lisbon to the National Stadium) was an innovative project that made Portugal one of the first countries in the world to establish a motorway (this roadway eventually became the Lisbon-Cascais highway, or A5).

Although a few other tracts were created (around 1960 and 1970), it was only after the beginning of the 1980s that large-scale motorway construction was implemented. In 1972, Brisa, the highway concessionaire, was founded to handle the management of many of the region's motorways. On many highways, a toll needs to be paid (see Via Verde). Vasco da Gama bridge is the longest bridge in the EU (the second longest in Europe) at 12.345 km.

Continental Portugal's  territory is serviced by four international airports located near the principal cities of Lisbon, Porto, Faro and Beja. Lisbon's geographical position makes it a stopover for many foreign airlines at several airports within the country. The primary flag-carrier is TAP Air Portugal, although many other domestic airlines provide services within and without the country. The government decided to build a new airport outside Lisbon, in Alcochete, to replace Lisbon Portela Airport, though this plan has been suspended due to austerity measures. Currently, the most important airports are in Lisbon, Porto, Faro, Funchal (Madeira), and Ponta Delgada (Azores), managed by the national airport authority group ANA – Aeroportos de Portugal. One other important airport is the Aeroporto Internacional das Lajes on the island of Terceira in the Azores. This airport serves as one of two international airports serving countries outside the European Union for all nine islands of the Azores. It also serves as a military air base for the United States Air Force. The base remains in use to the present day.

A national railway system that extends throughout the country and into Spain, is supported and administered by Comboios de Portugal (CP). The railway network is managed by Infraestruturas de Portugal while the transport of passengers and goods are the responsibility of CP, both public companies.

The major seaports are located in Sines, Lisbon, Leixões, Setúbal, Aveiro, Figueira da Foz, and Faro.

In Portugal, Lisbon tram services have been supplied by the Companhia de Carris de Ferro de Lisboa (Carris), for over a century. In Porto, a tram network, of which only a tourist line on the shores of the Douro remains, began construction on 12 September 1895 (a first for the Iberian Peninsula). All major cities and towns have their own local urban transport network, as well as taxi services.

Energy 

Portugal has considerable resources of wind and river power, the two most cost-effective renewable energy sources. Since the turn of the 21st century, there has been a trend towards the development of a renewable resource industry and reduction of both consumption and use of fossil fuels. In 2006, the world's largest solar power plant at that date, the Moura Photovoltaic Power Station, began operating near Moura, in the south, while the world's first commercial wave power farm, the Aguçadoura Wave Farm, opened in the Norte region (2008). By the end of 2006, 66% of the country's electrical production was from coal and fuel power plants, while 29% were derived from hydroelectric dams, and 6% by wind energy.

In 2008, renewable energy resources were producing 43% of the nation's consumption of electricity, even as hydroelectric production decreased with severe droughts. As of June 2010, electricity exports had outnumbered imports. In the period between January and May 2010, 70% of the national production of energy came from renewable sources.

Portugal's national energy transmission company, Redes Energéticas Nacionais (REN), uses sophisticated modelling to predict weather, especially wind patterns, and computer programs to calculate energy from the various renewable-energy plants.
Before the solar/wind revolution, Portugal had generated electricity from hydropower plants on its rivers for decades. New programmes combine wind and water: wind-driven turbines pump water uphill at night, the most blustery period; then the water flows downhill by day, generating electricity, when consumer demand is highest. Portugal's distribution system is also now a two-way street. Instead of just delivering electricity, it draws electricity from even the smallest generators, like rooftop solar panels. The government aggressively encouraged such contributions by setting a premium price for those who buy rooftop-generated solar electricity.

Demographics 

The Statistics Portugal estimates that, according to the 2021 census, the population was 10,343,066 (of which 52.4% was female and 47.6% was male). The median life expectancy in 2022 was 82.47 years. 
This population has been relatively homogeneous for most of its history: a single religion (Roman Catholicism) and a single language have contributed to this ethnic and national unity.

The most important demographic influence in the modern Portuguese seems to be the oldest one; current interpretation of Y-chromosome and mtDNA data suggests that the Portuguese have their origin in Paleolithic peoples that began arriving to the European continent around 45,000 years ago. All subsequent migrations did leave an impact, genetically and culturally, but the main population source of the Portuguese is still Paleolithic. Genetic studies show Portuguese populations not to be significantly different from other European populations. Portuguese people have a preponderancy of genetics (Iron Age Period) which belong to R1b haplogroup family along with Brythonic, Alpine and Goidelic genetical markers. Also expectable but not so common are South European (Sardinian, Italian and Balkans), broadly North-western (West Germanic) and to a lesser extent British/Irish (Brythonic/Gaelic) and French (Alpine). With a low confidence range there are Scandinavian and East European genetical markers. Other sources would point out a small presence of Berber and Jewish that would be also part of a low confidence region.

Native Portuguese are an Iberian ethnic group and they form 95% of the whole population, whose ancestry is very similar to Spaniards and have strong ties with fellow Atlantic Arc countries like Ireland, British Isles, France and Belgium due to maritime trade dated as far back as the Bronze Age. These maritime contacts and the prevalence of R1b haplogroup as the main genetical marker of these countries suggest a common ancestry and cultural proximity. Other maritime contacts with the Mediterranean especially with Greeks, Phoenicians, Romans and Moors added some phenotypes in southern Portugal and particularly southern Spain (the Tartessos culture), making Portugal and north-western Spain a bridge between north-western Europe and the Mediterranean but maintaining the Atlantic character.

Despite good economic development in the past three decades, the Portuguese have been the shortest in Europe since 1890. This emerging height gap took place in the 1840s and has increased since. One of the driving factors was the modest real wage development, given the late industrialization and economic growth in Portugal compared to the European core. Another determinant was the delayed human capital formation.

The total fertility rate (TFR)  was estimated at 1.52 children born/woman, one of the lowest in the world, which is below the replacement rate of 2.1, it remains considerably below the high of 5.02 children born per woman in 1911. In 2016, 52.8% of births were to unmarried women.
Like most Western countries, Portugal has to deal with low fertility levels: the country has experienced a sub-replacement fertility rate since the 1980s. Portugal subsequently has the 17th oldest population in the world, with the average age of 43.7 years.

The structure of Portuguese society is characterized by a significant inequality which in 2016 placed the country in the lowest seventh of the Social Justice Index for the European Union.

In 2018, Portugal's parliament approved a budget plan for 2019 that includes tax breaks for returning emigrants in a bid to lure back those who left during the financial crisis of 2007–2008. The expansionary 2019 budget, backed by a left-wing majority in parliament, also aims to boost the purchasing power of households while cutting the already low deficit even further. Returning emigrants will be allowed to declare only half their taxable income for five years if they return, provided they have lived abroad for at least three years. The "Return Programme" is to run for two years. Around 500,000 residents left Portugal between 2010 and 2015 after the Great Recession. Although some 350,000 have since returned, this scheme aims to encourage more to return – a similar scheme exists in Ireland. Portugal has approved a credit line for Portuguese emigrants aiming to invest in the country on their return. Furthermore, emigrants returning in 2019 and 2020 will see their taxes halved as part of the stimulus to bring native Portuguese back and revitalize the population and promote continued economic growth – as Portugal struggles with a low birth rate and an ageing population. According to projections by the national statistics office, Portugal's population will fall to 7.7 million by 2080 from 10.3 million now and the population will continue to age.

Urbanization 
Since the 2013 local government reform, there are two metropolitan areas: Lisbon and Porto. Several metropolitan areas were created under this law (Algarve, Aveiro, Coimbra, Minho and Viseu), but a law passed in 2008 abolished these, converting them into intermunicipal communities, whose territories are (roughly) based on the NUTS III statistical regions.

Immigration 

In 2007, Portugal had 10,617,575 inhabitants, of whom about 332,137 were legal immigrants. In 2015, Portugal had 10,341,330 inhabitants, of whom about 383,759 were legal migrants, making up 3.7% of the population. In 2017, Portugal had 416,682 legal residents of foreign origin, of which 203,753 identified as male, and 212,929 as female. As of 2020, 32,147 residents of foreign origin acquired Portuguese nationality, of which 17,021 were female and 15,126 were male.

Portugal's colonial history has long since been a cornerstone of its national identity, as has its geographic position at the south-western corner of Europe, looking out into the Atlantic Ocean. It was one of the last western colonial European powers to give up its overseas territories (among them Angola and Mozambique in 1975), turning over the administration of Macau to the People's Republic of China at the end of 1999. Consequently, it has both influenced and been influenced by cultures from former colonies or dependencies, resulting in immigration from these former territories for both economic and personal reasons. Portugal, long a country of emigration (the vast majority of Brazilians have Portuguese ancestry), has now become a country of net immigration, and not just from the last Indian (Portuguese until 1961), African (Portuguese until 1975), and Far East Asian (Portuguese until 1999) overseas territories. An estimated 800,000 Portuguese returned to Portugal as the country's African possessions gained independence in 1975.

Since the 1990s, along with a boom in construction, several new waves of Ukrainian, Brazilian, Lusophone Africans and other Africans have settled in the country. Romanians, Moldovans, Kosovo Albanians, Russians and Chinese have also migrated to the country. Portugal's Romani population is estimated to be at about 40,000.

Numbers of Venezuelan, Pakistani and Indian migrants are also significant. It is estimated that over 30,000 seasonal, often illegal immigrants work in agriculture, mainly in the south where they are often exploited by organized seasonal workers' networks. The workers sometimes get paid less than half the minimum pay established by law. These migrants, who often arrive without due documentation or work contracts, make up over 90% of agricultural workers in the south of Portugal.
Most are Indo-Asians, from India, Bangladesh, Nepal, Pakistan and Thailand. In the interior of the Alentejo there are many African workers. Significant numbers also come from Eastern Europe, Moldova, Ukraine, Romania and Brazil.

In addition, a number of EU citizens, mostly from the United Kingdom or other northern European countries, have become permanent residents in the country (with the British community being mostly composed of retired pensioners who live in the Algarve and Madeira).

Religion 

Roman Catholicism, which has a long history in Portugal, remains the dominant religion. Portugal has no official religion, though in the past, the Catholic Church in Portugal was the state religion.
According to the 2021 Census, 80.2% of the Portuguese population was Roman Catholic Christian. The country has small Protestant, Latter-day Saint, Muslim, Hindu, Sikh, Eastern Orthodox Church, Jehovah's Witnesses, Baháʼí, Buddhist, Jewish and Spiritist communities. Influences from African Traditional Religion and Chinese Traditional Religion are also felt among many people, particularly in fields related with Traditional Chinese Medicine and Traditional African Herbal Medicine. Some 14.1% of the population declared themselves to be non-religious.

Many Portuguese holidays, festivals and traditions have a Christian origin or connotation. Although relations between the Portuguese state and the Roman Catholic Church were generally amiable and stable since the earliest years of the Portuguese nation, their relative power fluctuated. In the 13th and 14th centuries, the church enjoyed power and close identification with early Portuguese nationalism and the foundation of the Portuguese educational system, including its first university.

The growth of the Portuguese overseas empire made its missionaries important agents of colonization, with important roles in the education and evangelization of people from all the inhabited continents. The growth of liberal and nascent republican movements during the eras leading to the formation of the First Portuguese Republic (1910–26) changed the role and importance of organized religion.

Portugal is a secular state: church and state were formally separated during the First Portuguese Republic, and this was reiterated in the 1976 Portuguese Constitution. Other than the Constitution, the two most important documents relating to religious freedom in Portugal are the 1940 Concordata (later amended in 1971) between Portugal and the Holy See and the 2001 Religious Freedom Act.

Languages 

Portuguese is the official language of Portugal. It is a Romance language that is derived from Galician-Portuguese, which was spoken in what is now Galicia and Northern Portugal. There are still strong similarities between the Galician and Portuguese cultures. Galicia is a consultative observer of the Community of Portuguese Language Countries.

The Portuguese language is derived from the Latin spoken by the romanized pre-Roman peoples of the Iberian Peninsula around 2000 years ago – particularly the Celts, Conii, Lusitanians and Turduli.
In the 15th and 16th centuries, the language spread worldwide as Portugal established a colonial and commercial empire between 1415 and 1999.
Portuguese is spoken as a native language in five different continents, with Brazil accounting for the largest number of native Portuguese speakers of any country.
In 2013 the Portuguese language is the official language spoken in Brazil, Angola, Mozambique, Cape Verde, São Tomé and Príncipe, Guinea-Bissau, Equatorial Guinea, and East Timor. These countries, plus Macau Special Administrative Region (People's Republic of China) where Portuguese is co-official with Cantonese, make up the Lusosphere, a term derived from the ancient Roman province of "Lusitania", which currently matches the Portuguese territory south of the Douro river.

Mirandese is also recognized as a co-official regional language in some municipalities of North-Eastern Portugal. It is part of the Astur-Leonese group of languages. An estimate of between 6,000 and 7,000 Mirandese speakers has been documented for Portugal. Furthermore, a particular dialect known as Barranquenho, spoken in Barrancos, is also officially recognized and protected in Portugal since 2021. Minderico, a sociolect of the Portuguese language, is spoken by around 500 people in the town of Minde.

According to the International English Proficiency Index, Portugal has a high proficiency level in English, higher than those of other Romance-speaking European countries like Spain, Italy or France.

Education 

The educational system is divided into preschool (for those under age six), basic education (nine years, in three stages, compulsory), secondary education (three years, compulsory since 2010), and higher education (subdivided in university and polytechnic education). Universities are usually organized into faculties. Institutes and schools are also common designations for autonomous subdivisions of Portuguese higher education institutions.

The total adult literacy rate is 99.4 per cent. Portuguese primary school enrolments are 100 per cent. According to the Programme for International Student Assessment (PISA) 2018, Portugal scored around the OECD average in reading, mathematics and science. In reading and mathematics, mean performance in 2018 was close to the level observed in 2009 to 2015; in science, mean performance in 2018 was below that of 2015, and returned close to the level observed in 2009 and 2012.

About 46,9% of college-age citizens (20 years old) attend one of Portugal's higher education institutions (compared with 50% in the United States and 35% in the OECD countries). In addition to being a destination for international students, Portugal is also among the top places of origin for international students. All higher education students, both domestic and international, totalled 380,937 in 2005.

Portuguese universities have existed since 1290. The oldest Portuguese university was first established in Lisbon before moving to Coimbra. Historically, within the scope of the Portuguese Empire, the Portuguese founded the oldest engineering school of the Americas (the Real Academia de Artilharia, Fortificação e Desenho of Rio de Janeiro) in 1792, as well as the oldest medical college in Asia (the Escola Médico-Cirúrgica of Goa) in 1842. Presently, the largest university in Portugal is the University of Lisbon.

The Bologna process has been adopted by Portuguese universities and poly-technical institutes in 2006. Higher education in state-run educational establishments is provided on a competitive basis, a system of numerus clausus is enforced through a national database on student admissions. However, every higher education institution offers also a number of additional vacant places through other extraordinary admission processes for sportsmen, mature applicants (over 23 years old), international students, foreign students from the Lusosphere, degree owners from other institutions, students from other institutions (academic transfer), former students (readmission), and course change, which are subject to specific standards and regulations set by each institution or course department.

Most student costs are supported with public money. However, with the increasing tuition fees a student has to pay to attend a Portuguese state-run higher education institution and the attraction of new types of students (many as international students and part-time students or in evening classes) like employees, businessmen, parents, pensioners and foreigners (most prominently from Brazil, a Portuguese-speaking country), many departments make a substantial profit from every additional student enrolled in courses, with benefits for the college or university's gross tuition revenue and without loss of educational quality (teacher per student, computer per student, classroom size per student, etc.).

Portugal has entered into cooperation agreements with the Massachusetts Institute of Technology and other US institutions to further develop and increase the effectiveness of Portuguese higher education and research.

Health 

According to the Human Development Report, the average life expectancy in Portugal had reached 82 years in 2017; in 2020 it was estimated at 82.11 years. As projected by the United Nations, the life expectancy of the Portuguese population will be over 90 years when we reach 2100. The trajectory of the Portuguese life expectancy is visualized with historical data from 1950 and future projections up to 2100, as can be seen in the graph on the left.

Portugal ranks 12th in the best public health systems in the world, ahead of other countries like the United Kingdom, Germany or Sweden.

The Portuguese health system is characterized by three coexisting systems: the National Health Service (Serviço Nacional de Saúde, SNS), special social health insurance schemes for certain professions (health subsystems) and voluntary private health insurance. The SNS provides universal coverage. In addition, about 25% of the population is covered by the health subsystems, 10% by private insurance schemes and another 7% by mutual funds.

The Ministry of Health is responsible for developing health policy as well as managing the SNS. Five regional health administrations are in charge of implementing the national health policy objectives, developing guidelines and protocols and supervising health care delivery. Decentralization efforts have aimed at shifting financial and management responsibility to the regional level. In practice, however, the autonomy of regional health administrations over budget setting and spending has been limited to primary care.

The SNS is predominantly funded through general taxation. Employer (including the state) and employee contributions represent the main funding sources of the health subsystems. In addition, direct payments by the patient and voluntary health insurance premiums account for a large proportion of funding.

Similar to the other Eur-A countries, most Portuguese die from noncommunicable diseases. Mortality from cardiovascular diseases (CVD) is higher than in the eurozone, but its two main components, ischaemic heart disease and cerebrovascular disease, display inverse trends compared with the Eur-A, with cerebrovascular disease being the single biggest killer in Portugal (17%). Portuguese people die 12% less often from cancer than in the Eur-A, but mortality is not declining as rapidly as in the Eur-A. Cancer is more frequent among children as well as among women younger than 44 years. Although lung cancer (slowly increasing among women) and breast cancer (decreasing rapidly) are scarcer, cervical cancer and prostate cancer are more frequent.
Portugal has the highest mortality rate for diabetes in the Eur-A, with a sharp increase since the 1980s.

Portugal's infant mortality rate is around 2 deaths per 1000 newborns, with 2.4 deaths per 1000 live births.

People are usually well informed about their health status, the positive and negative effects of their behaviour on their health, and their use of health care services. Yet their perceptions of their health, can differ from what administrative and examination-based data show about levels of illness within populations. Thus, survey results based on self-reporting at household level, complement other data on health status and the use of services.

Only one third of adults rated their health as good or very good in Portugal (Kasmel et al., 2004). This is the lowest of the Eur-A countries reporting and reflects the relatively adverse situation of the country in terms of mortality and selected morbidity. Hospital de Santa Maria is the largest university hospital in Portugal.

Culture 

Portugal has developed a specific culture while being influenced by various civilizations that have crossed the Mediterranean and the European continent, or were introduced when it played an active role during the Age of Discovery. In the 1990s and 2000s (decade), Portugal modernized its public cultural facilities, in addition to the Calouste Gulbenkian Foundation established in 1956 in Lisbon.

These include the Belém Cultural Centre in Lisbon, Serralves Foundation and the Casa da Música, both in Porto, as well as new public cultural facilities like municipal libraries and concert halls that were built or renovated in many municipalities across the country.
Portugal is home to 17 UNESCO World Heritage Sites, ranking it 9th in Europe and 18th in the world.

Architecture 

Traditional architecture is distinctive and include the Manueline, also known as Portuguese late Gothic a sumptuous, composite Portuguese style of architectural ornamentation of the first decades of the 16th century, followed by Pombaline style of the 18th century. A 20th-century interpretation of traditional architecture, Soft Portuguese style, appears extensively in major cities, especially Lisbon. Modern Portugal has given the world renowned architects like Eduardo Souto de Moura, Álvaro Siza Vieira (both Pritzker Prize winners) and Gonçalo Byrne. In Portugal Tomás Taveira is also noteworthy, particularly for stadium design.

Cinema 

Portuguese cinema has a long tradition, reaching back to the birth of the medium in the late 19th century.
António Lopes Ribeiro, António Reis, Pedro Costa, Manoel de Oliveira, João César Monteiro, José Fonseca e Costa, Edgar Pêra, António-Pedro Vasconcelos, Fernando Lopes, João Botelho, João Mário Grilo and Leonel Vieira, are among those that gained notability. Noted Portuguese film actors include Joaquim de Almeida, Nuno Lopes, Daniela Ruah, Maria de Medeiros, Diogo Infante, Soraia Chaves, Ribeirinho, Lúcia Moniz, and Diogo Morgado.

Literature 

Portuguese literature, one of the earliest Western literatures, developed through text as well as song. Until 1350, the Portuguese-Galician troubadours spread their literary influence to most of the Iberian Peninsula, like King D. Dinis (1261–1325) who became famous for his poetry. Other kings would write and sponsor works of literature across Portuguese history, like D. Fernando (1367–1383) who supported Pêro Menino in writing o Livro da Falcoaria. Another notable name in Portuguese literature is Gil Vicente (c. 1465–c. 1536), one of the founders of Portuguese dramatic traditions.

Adventurer and poet Luís de Camões (c. 1524–1580) wrote the epic poem Os Lusíadas (The Lusiads), with Virgil's Aeneid as his main influence. Modern Portuguese poetry is rooted in neoclassic and contemporary styles, as exemplified by Bocage (1765–1805), Antero de Quental (1842–1891) and Fernando Pessoa (1888–1935). Modern Portuguese literature is represented by authors such as Almeida Garrett, Camilo Castelo Branco, Eça de Queirós, Fernando Pessoa, Sophia de Mello Breyner Andresen, António Lobo Antunes, Miguel Torga and Agustina Bessa-Luís. Particularly popular and distinguished is José Saramago, recipient of the 1998 Nobel Prize in Literature.

Cuisine 

Portuguese cuisine is very diverse. The Portuguese consume a lot of dry cod (bacalhau in Portuguese), for which there are hundreds of recipes. Two other popular fish recipes are grilled sardines and caldeirada, a tomato-based stew that can be made from several types of fish or molluscs with a mix of onion, garlic, bay leaf, potatoes, tomatoes, peppers, parsley or coriander. Typical Portuguese meat recipes made out of beef, pork,  chicken, goat, lamb, duck, include cozido à portuguesa, feijoada, frango de churrasco, leitão (roast suckling pig), chanfana and carne de porco à alentejana. A very popular northern dish is dobrada, a tripe with white beans and carrots stew, often served with steamed white rice. Peri-peri chicken is a spicy charcoal chicken dish served with fries or rice and vegetables, a favourite throughout Portugal, but most common in the Algarve region.

Typical fast food dishes include the Francesinha (Frenchie) from Porto, "Tripas à moda do Porto" which is also a traditional dish from Porto, and bifanas (grilled pork) or prego (grilled beef) sandwiches, which are well known around the country. The Portuguese art of pastry has its origins in the many medieval Catholic monasteries spread widely across the country. These monasteries, using very few ingredients (mostly eggs, vanilla, cinnamon, flour, almonds and some liqueurs), managed to create a spectacular wide range of different pastries, of which pastéis de Belém (or pastéis de nata) originally from Lisbon, and ovos moles from Aveiro are examples. Portuguese cuisine is very diverse, with different regions having their own traditional dishes. The Portuguese have a culture of good food, and throughout the country there are myriad good restaurants and typical small tasquinhas.

Portuguese wines have enjoyed international recognition since the times of the Romans, who associated Portugal with their god Bacchus. Today, the country is known by wine lovers and its wines have won several international prizes. Some of the best Portuguese wines are Vinho Verde, Vinho Alvarinho, Vinho do Douro, Vinho do Alentejo, Vinho do Dão, Vinho da Bairrada and the sweet Port Wine, Madeira Wine, and the Moscatel from Setúbal and Favaios. Port and Madeira are particularly appreciated in a wide range of places around the world.

Music 

Portuguese music encompasses a wide variety of genres. The traditional one is the Portuguese folk music which has deep roots in local customs, utilising instruments such as bagpipes (gaita), drums, flutes, tambourines, accordions and ukuleles (cavaquinho). Within Portuguese folk music is the renowned genre of Fado, a melancholic urban music originated in Lisbon in the 19th century, probably inside bohemian environments, usually associated with the Portuguese guitar and saudade, or longing. Coimbra fado, a unique type of "troubadour serenading" fado, is also noteworthy. Internationally notable performers include Amália Rodrigues, Carlos Paredes, José Afonso, Mariza, Carlos do Carmo, António Chainho, Mísia, Dulce Pontes and Madredeus.

In the classical music domain, Portugal is represented by names as the pianists Artur Pizarro, Maria João Pires, Sequeira Costa, the violinists Carlos Damas, Gerardo Ribeiro and in the past by the great cellist Guilhermina Suggia. Notable composers include Marcos Portugal, José Vianna da Motta, Carlos Seixas, João Domingos Bomtempo, João de Sousa Carvalho, Luís de Freitas Branco and his student Joly Braga Santos, Fernando Lopes-Graça, Emmanuel Nunes and Sérgio Azevedo. Similarly, contemporary composers such as Nuno Malo and Miguel d'Oliveira have achieved some international success writing.

In addition to Folk, Fado and Classical music, other genres are present at Portugal like pop and other types of modern music, particularly from North America and the United Kingdom, as well as a wide range of Portuguese, Caribbean, Lusophone African and Brazilian artists and bands. Artists with international recognition include Dulce Pontes, Moonspell, Buraka Som Sistema, Blasted Mechanism, David Carreira and The Gift, with the three latter being nominees for a MTV Europe Music Award.

Portugal has several summer music festivals, such as Festival Sudoeste in Zambujeira do Mar, Festival de Paredes de Coura in Paredes de Coura, Festival Vilar de Mouros near Caminha, Boom Festival in Idanha-a-Nova Municipality, NOS Alive, Sumol Summer Fest in Ericeira, Rock in Rio Lisboa and Super Bock Super Rock in Greater Lisbon. Out of the summer season, Portugal has a large number of festivals, designed more to an urban audience, like Flowfest or Hip Hop Porto. Furthermore, one of the largest international Goa trance festivals takes place in central Portugal every two years, the Boom Festival, that is also the only festival in Portugal to win international awards: European Festival Award 2010 – Green'n'Clean Festival of the Year and the Greener Festival Award Outstanding 2008 and 2010. There is also the student festivals of Queima das Fitas are major events in a number of cities across Portugal. In 2005, Portugal held the MTV Europe Music Awards, in Pavilhão Atlântico, Lisbon. Furthermore, Portugal won the Eurovision Song Contest 2017 in Kyiv with the song "Amar pelos dois" presented by Salvador Sobral, and subsequently hosted the 2018 contest at the Altice Arena in Lisbon.

Visual arts 

Portugal has a rich history in painting. The first well-known painters dating back to the 15th century – like Nuno Gonçalves and Vasco Fernandes – were part of the late Gothic painting period. During the Renaissance, Portuguese painting was highly influenced by Northern European painting. In the Baroque period Josefa de Óbidos and Vieira Lusitano were the most prolific painters.
José Malhoa, known for his work Fado, and Columbano Bordalo Pinheiro (who painted the portraits of Teófilo Braga and Antero de Quental) were both references in naturalist painting.

The 20th century saw the arrival of Modernism, and along with it came the most prominent Portuguese painters: Amadeo de Souza-Cardoso, who was heavily influenced by French painters, particularly the Delaunays (Robert and Sonia). Among his best-known works is Canção Popular a Russa e o Fígaro. Other great modernist painters/writers include Carlos Botelho and Almada Negreiros, friend to the poet Fernando Pessoa, who painted Pessoa's portrait. He was deeply influenced by both Cubist and Futurist trends.

Prominent international figures in visual arts nowadays include painters Vieira da Silva, Júlio Pomar, Helena Almeida, Joana Vasconcelos, Julião Sarmento and Paula Rego.

Sport 

Football is the most popular sport in Portugal. There are several football competitions ranging from local amateur to world-class professional level. The legendary Eusébio is still a major symbol of Portuguese football history. FIFA World Player of the Year winners Luís Figo and Cristiano Ronaldo, who won the FIFA Ballon d'Or, are two world-class Portuguese football players. Portuguese football managers are also noteworthy, with José Mourinho being among the most renowned.

The Portugal national football team – Seleção Nacional – have won one UEFA European Championship title: the UEFA Euro 2016, with a 1–0 victory in the final over France, the tournament hosts. In addition, Portugal finished first in the 2018–19 UEFA Nations League with a 1–0 win over the Netherlands in the final (held in Portugal), second in the Euro 2004 (also held in Portugal), third in the 1966 FIFA World Cup and 2017 FIFA Confederations Cup, and fourth in the 2006 FIFA World Cup. At youth level, Portugal have won two FIFA World Youth Championships (in 1989 and 1991) and several UEFA European Youth Championships.

S.L. Benfica, Sporting CP and FC Porto are the largest sports clubs by popularity and by number of trophies won, often known as "os três grandes" ("the big three"). They have won eight titles in the European UEFA club competitions, were present in 21 finals and have been regular contenders in the last stages almost every season. Other than football, many Portuguese sports clubs, including the "big three", compete in several other sports events with a varying level of success and popularity, these may include roller hockey, basketball, futsal, handball, volleyball and athletics.
The Portuguese Football Federation (FPF)  – Federação Portuguesa de Futebol – annually hosts the Algarve Cup, a prestigious women's football tournament that has been celebrated in the Portuguese region of Algarve.

The Portuguese national rugby union team qualified for the 2007 Rugby World Cup and the Portuguese national rugby sevens team has played in the World Rugby Sevens Series.

In athletics, the Portuguese have won a number of gold, silver and bronze medals in the European, World and Olympic Games competitions. Road cycling, with Volta a Portugal being the most important race, is also a popular sports event and includes professional cycling teams such as Sporting CP, Boavista, Clube de Ciclismo de Tavira and União Ciclista da Maia. At international level, Portuguese cyclists have already achieved good results. Joaquim Agostinho finished on the podium in 1978 and 1979 Tour de France, and 1974 Vuelta a España. Rui Costa has won the world title in the men's road race.

The country has also achieved notable performances in sports including fencing, judo, kitesurf, rowing, sailing, surfing, shooting, taekwondo, triathlon and windsurfing, winning several European and world titles. Portugal's paralympic athletes have also won many medals in sports including swimming, boccia, athletics, mixed martial arts and wrestling.

In motorsport, Portugal is internationally noted for the Rally of Portugal, and the Estoril and Algarve Circuits as well as the revived Porto Street Circuit which holds a stage of the WTCC every two years, as well as for a number of internationally noted pilots and racers such as Miguel Oliveira, Tiago Monteiro, António Félix da Costa, Filipe Albuquerque, Pedro Lamy, Armindo Araújo and others in a wide range of varied motorsports.

In equestrian sports, Portugal won the only Horseball-Pato World Championship in 2006 achieved the third position in the First Horseball World Cup and has achieved several victories in the European Working Equitation Championship.

In water sports, Portugal has three major sports: swimming, water polo and surfing. Most recently, Portugal had success in canoeing with several world and European champions, such as olympic medalists. Annually, the country also hosts one of the stages of the World Surf League men's and women's Championship Tour, the MEO Rip Curl Pro Portugal at the Supertubos in Peniche.

Northern Portugal has its own original martial art, Jogo do Pau, in which the fighters use staffs to confront one or several opponents. Other popular sport-related recreational outdoor activities with thousands of enthusiasts nationwide include airsoft, fishing, golf, hiking, hunting and orienteering.

Portugal is one of the world's best golf destinations. It has received several awards by the World Golf Awards.

High-profile, successful competitive athleticism and sportsmanship in Portugal can be traced back to the time of Ancient Rome. Gaius Appuleius Diocles (104after 146 AD) was a noteworthy charioteer born in Lamego who became one of the most celebrated athletes in ancient history. He is often cited as the highest-paid athlete of all time.

See also 

 Index of Portugal-related articles
 Outline of Portugal

Notes

References

Sources

External links 

 
 
 National English language newspaper
 National Wine Website
 News about Portugal from the Portuguese American Journal
 Portugal at UCB Libraries GovPubs
 Portugal profile from the BBC News
 Portugal. The World Factbook. Central Intelligence Agency.
 
 Portuguese Pamphlets Collection From the Rare Book and Special Collections Division at the Library of Congress
 

 Government
 Official Parliament website
 Official Portuguese Government website 
Trade
 World Bank Summary Trade Statistics Portugal
 Travel
 Official Portuguese Government Travel/media website
 Official Travel and Tourism office website

 
Iberian Peninsula countries
Member states of NATO
Member states of the Community of Portuguese Language Countries
Member states of the European Union
Member states of the Union for the Mediterranean
Member states of the United Nations
North African countries
Portuguese-speaking countries and territories
Republics
Southern European countries
Southwestern European countries
Countries in Europe
States and territories established in the 860s
Transcontinental countries
OECD members